= House of Dragomir Popovic =

Historical building in Ivanjica, Serbia

The house of Dragomir Popovic Кућа Драгомира Поповића Kuća Dragomira Popovića
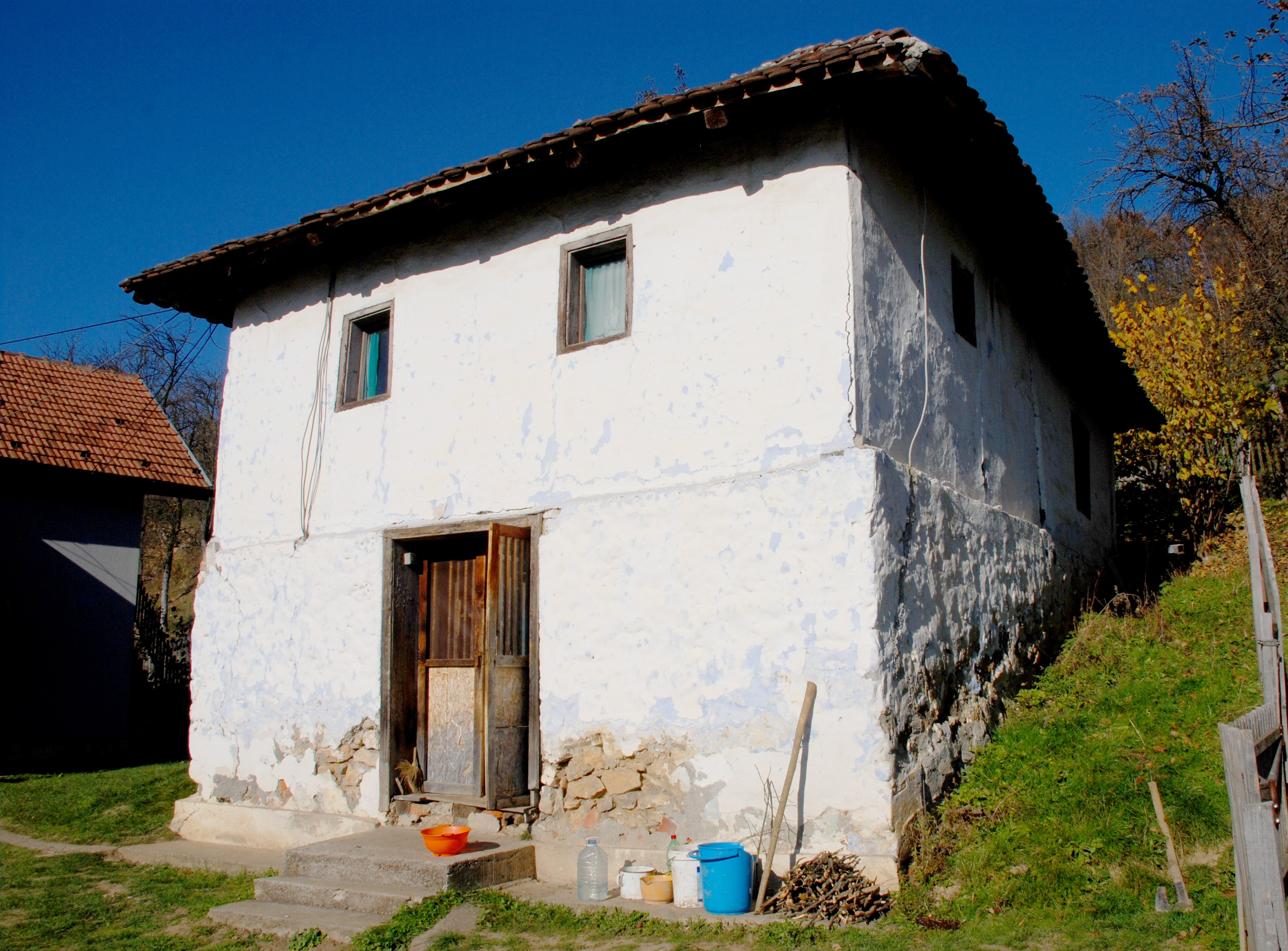

Religion
- Leadership: Institute for Cultural Heritage Preservation Kraljevo

Location
- Location: Ivanjica, Serbia
- Interactive map of The house of Dragomir Popovic; Кућа Драгомира Поповића; Kuća Dragomira Popovića
- Coordinates: 43°35′35″N 20°13′38″E

Website
- Official website

The house of Dragomir Popovic is a cultural and historical monument in Ivanjica. The construction of the house is characteristic of the Moravica District, where Milinko Kusic was born, a national hero.

Milinko Kusic was born in 1912, started education first in Ivanjica and later studied philosophy and law at the University of Belgrade. Milinko Kusic was a prominent fighter and leader of the uprising in World War II. His legacy has led to an elementary school being named after him in Ivanjica, as well as the main street of the city.

== See also ==
- Stara čaršija (Ivanjica)
