= Bedina Varoš =

- Town
- Location within Serbia
- Coordinates: 43°34′N 20°13′E
- Country: Serbia
- District: Moravica District
- Municipality: Ivanjica

Area
  - Total: 21.13 km^{2} (8.16 sq mi)

Population (2011)
  - Total: 1,680
  - Density: 79.5/km^{2} (206/sq mi)
- Time zone: UTC+1 (CET)
  - Summer (DST): UTC+2 (CEST)

Bedina Varoš is a town in the municipality of Ivanjica, Serbia. According to the 2011 census, the town has a population of 1,680 inhabitants.
