= Gleđica =

- Village
- Location within Serbia
- Coordinates: 43°26′13″N 20°13′45″E
- Country: Serbia
- District: Moravica District
- Municipality: Ivanjica

Area
  - Total: 35.23 km^{2} (13.60 sq mi)

Population (2011)
  - Total: 193
  - Density: 5.48/km^{2} (14.2/sq mi)
- Time zone: UTC+1 (CET)
  - Summer (DST): UTC+2 (CEST)

Gleđica is a village in the municipality of Ivanjica, Serbia. According to the 2011 census, the village has a population of 193 inhabitants.
