= Deretin =

- Village
- Location within Serbia
- Coordinates: 43°29′56″N 20°07′35″E
- Country: Serbia
- District: Moravica District
- Municipality: Ivanjica

Area
  - Total: 16.63 km^{2} (6.42 sq mi)

Population (2011)
  - Total: 175
  - Density: 10.5/km^{2} (27.3/sq mi)
- Time zone: UTC+1 (CET)
  - Summer (DST): UTC+2 (CEST)

Deretin is a village in the municipality of Ivanjica, Serbia. According to the 2011 census, the village has a population of 175 inhabitants.
