= Sivčina =

- Village
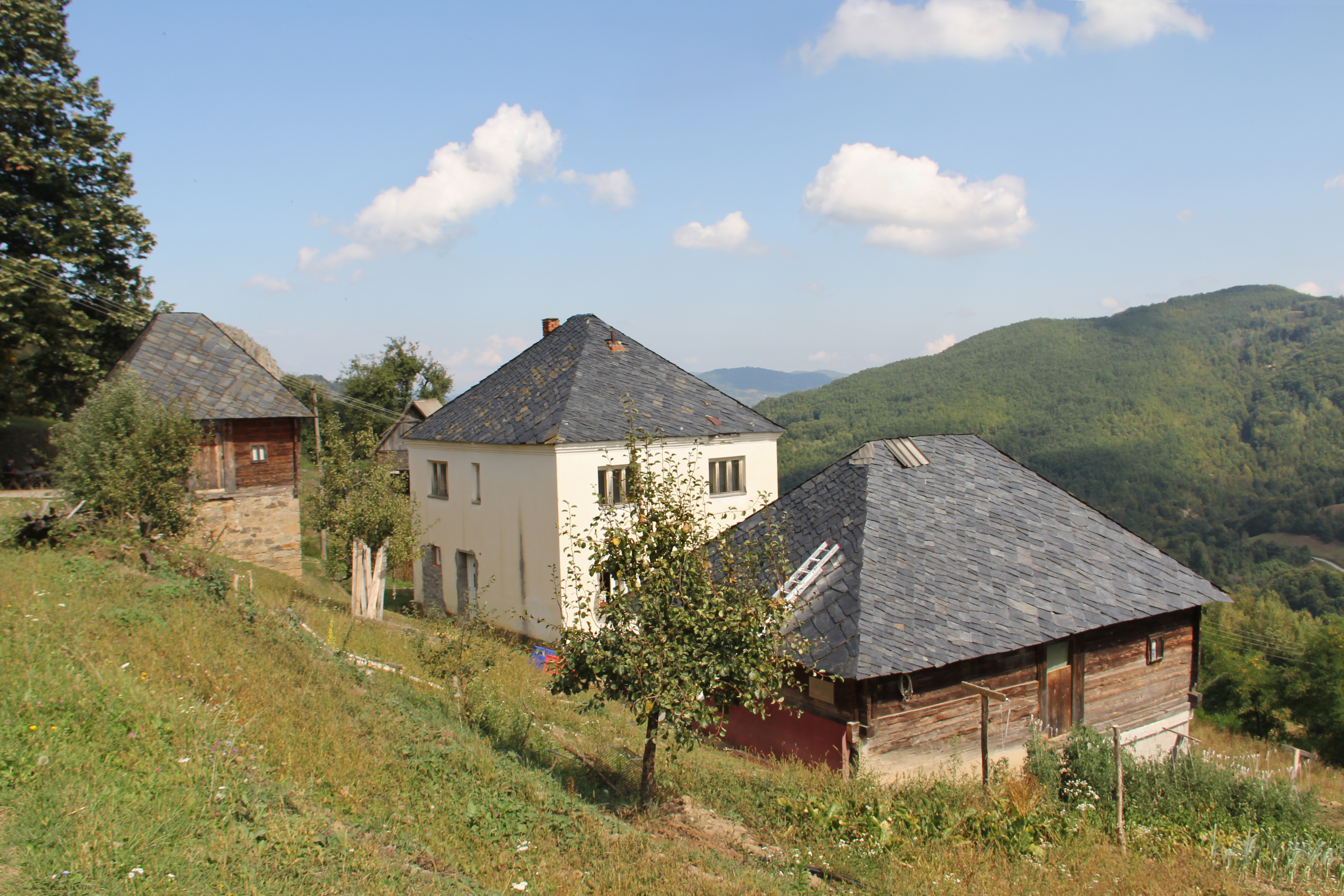
- Sivčina

- Location within Serbia
- Coordinates: 43°33′29″N 20°08′41″E
- Country: Serbia
- District: Moravica District
- Municipality: Ivanjica

Area
  - Total: 22.55 km^{2} (8.71 sq mi)

Population (2011)
  - Total: 194
  - Density: 8.60/km^{2} (22.3/sq mi)
- Time zone: UTC+1 (CET)
  - Summer (DST): UTC+2 (CEST)

Sivčina is a village in the municipality of Ivanjica, Serbia. According to the 2011 census, the village has a population of 194 inhabitants.
