= Vasiljevići (Ivanjica) =

- Village
- Location in Serbia
- Coordinates: 43°23′40″N 20°08′14″E
- Country: Serbia
- District: Moravica District
- Municipality: Ivanjica

Area
  - Total: 14.74 km^{2} (5.69 sq mi)

Population (2002)
  - Total: 64
  - Density: 4.3/km^{2} (11/sq mi)
- Time zone: UTC+1 (CET)
  - Summer (DST): UTC+2 (CEST)

Vasiljevići is a village in the municipality of Ivanjica, Serbia. According to the 2002 census, the village had a population of 64 people.
