= Sveštica =

- Village
- Nickname: Gornje Crnjevo or Doljni Crnjevo
- Location within Serbia
- Coordinates: 43°35′32″N 20°13′39″E
- Country: Serbia
- District: Moravica District
- Municipality: Ivanjica

Area
  - Total: 18.71 km^{2} (7.22 sq mi)

Population (2011)
  - Total: 1,295
  - Density: 69.21/km^{2} (179.3/sq mi)
- Time zone: UTC+1 (CET)
  - Summer (DST): UTC+2 (CEST)

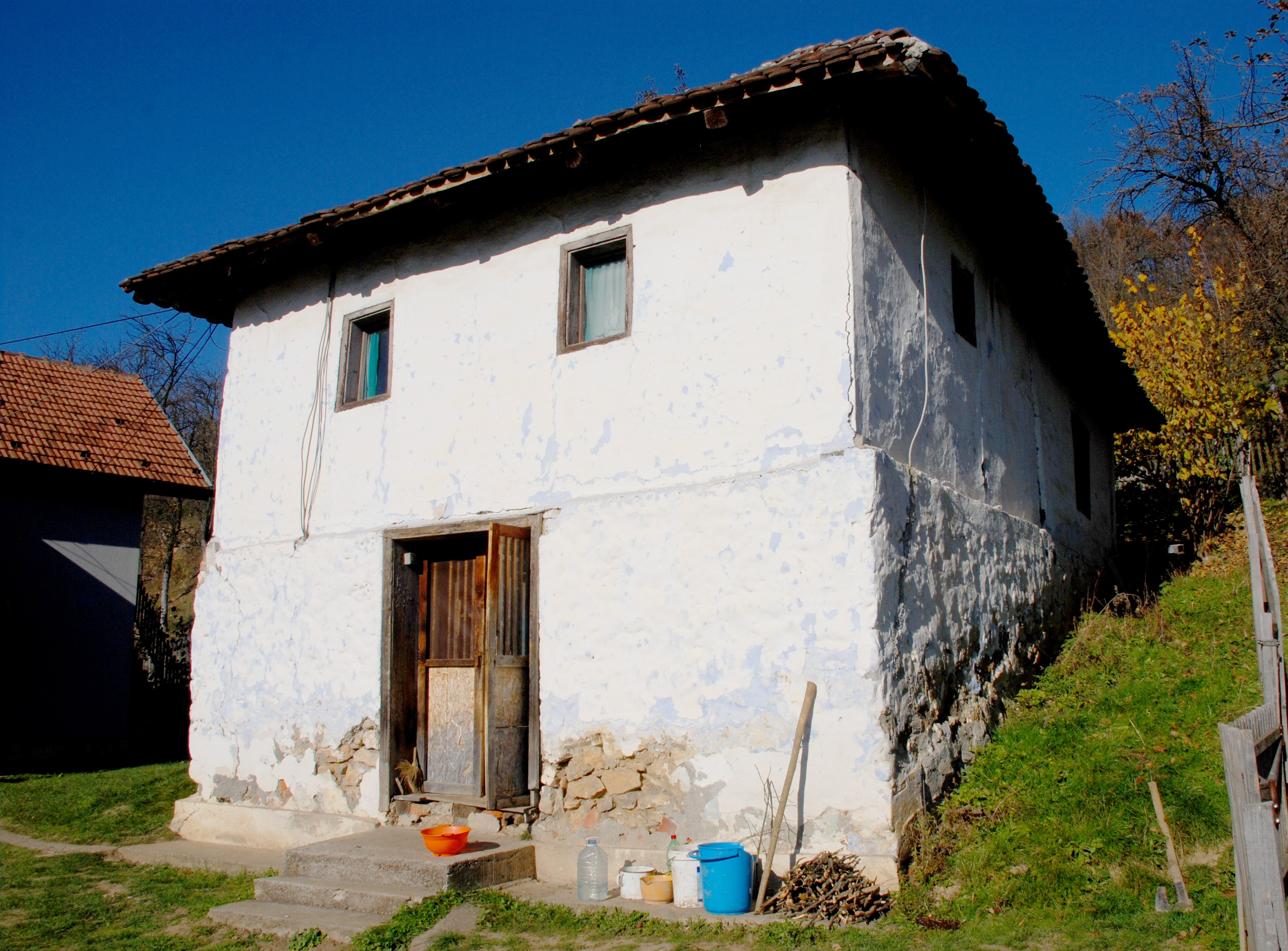
House in Sveštica

Sveštica is a village in the municipality of Ivanjica, Serbia. According to the 2011 census, the village has a population of 1,295 inhabitants.
