= Komadine =

- Village
- Location within Serbia
- Coordinates: 43°30′00″N 20°15′32″E
- Country: Serbia
- District: Moravica District
- Municipality: Ivanjica

Area
  - Total: 14.45 km^{2} (5.58 sq mi)

Population (2011)
  - Total: 161
  - Density: 11.1/km^{2} (28.9/sq mi)
- Time zone: UTC+1 (CET)
  - Summer (DST): UTC+2 (CEST)

Komadine is a village in the municipality of Ivanjica, Serbia. According to the 2011 census, the village has a population of 161 inhabitants.
