= Maskova (Ivanjica) =

Coordinates: 43°30′40″N 20°03′05″E

- Village
- Interactive map of Maskova
- Country: Serbia
- District: Moravica District
- Municipality: Ivanjica

Area
  - Total: 16.94 km^{2} (6.54 sq mi)

Population (2011)
  - Total: 192
  - Density: 11.3/km^{2} (29.4/sq mi)
- Time zone: UTC+1 (CET)
  - Summer (DST): UTC+2 (CEST)

Maskova is a village in the municipality of Ivanjica, Serbia. According to the 2011 census, the village has a population of 192 inhabitants.
