= Bratljevo =

- Village
- Location within Serbia
- Coordinates: 43°30′06″N 20°09′49″E
- Country: Serbia
- District: Moravica District
- Municipality: Ivanjica

Area
  - Total: 17.18 km^{2} (6.63 sq mi)
- Elevation: 1,030 m (3,380 ft)

Population (2011)
  - Total: 135
  - Density: 7.86/km^{2} (20.4/sq mi)
- Time zone: UTC+1 (CET)
  - Summer (DST): UTC+2 (CEST)

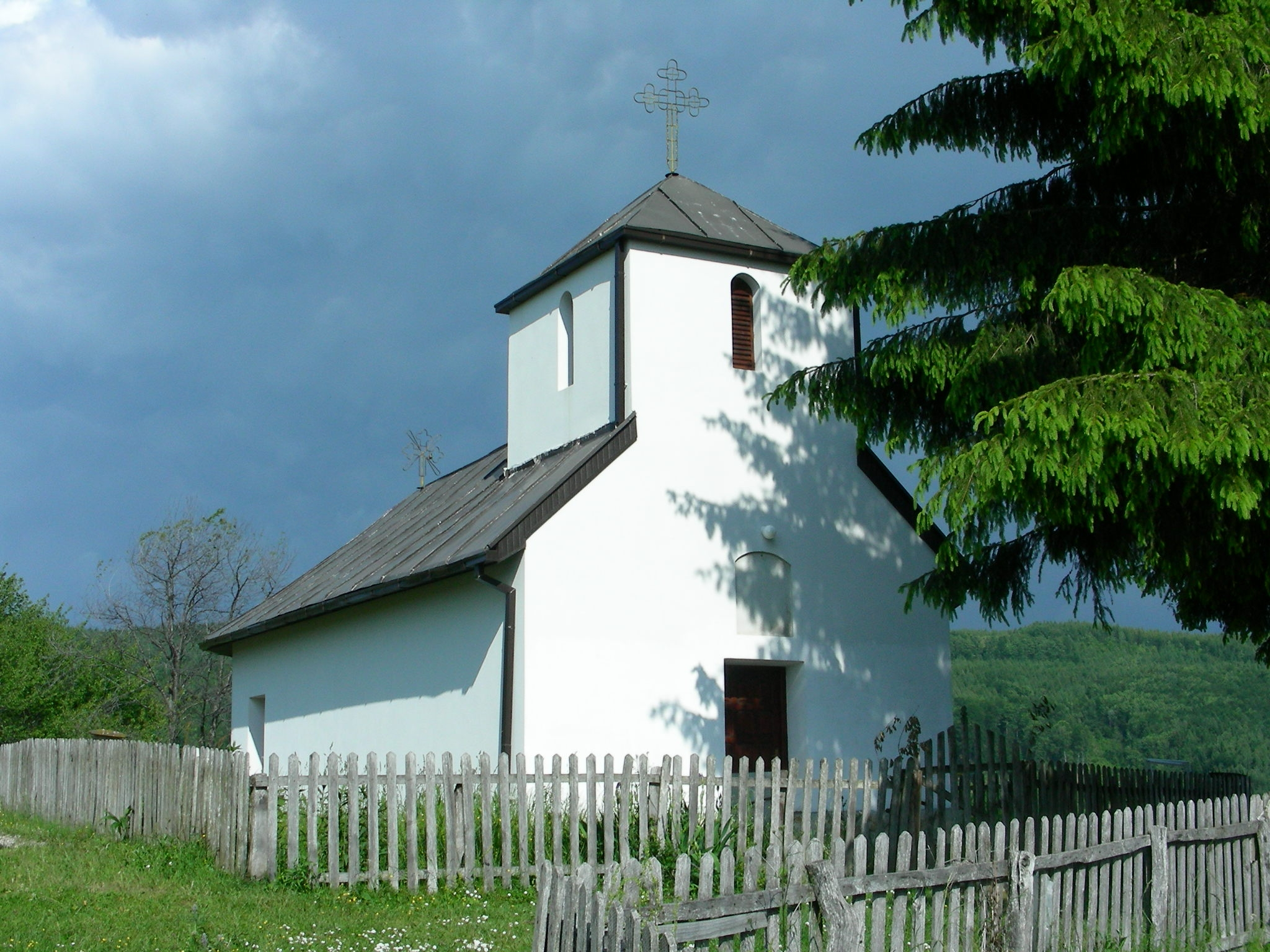
Bratljevo Church

Bratljevo is a village in the municipality of Ivanjica, Serbia. According to the 2011 census, the village has a population of 135 inhabitants.
