= Ivanjica =

Town and municipality in Moravica District, Serbia

Ivanjica Ивањица (Serbian)
- Town and municipality
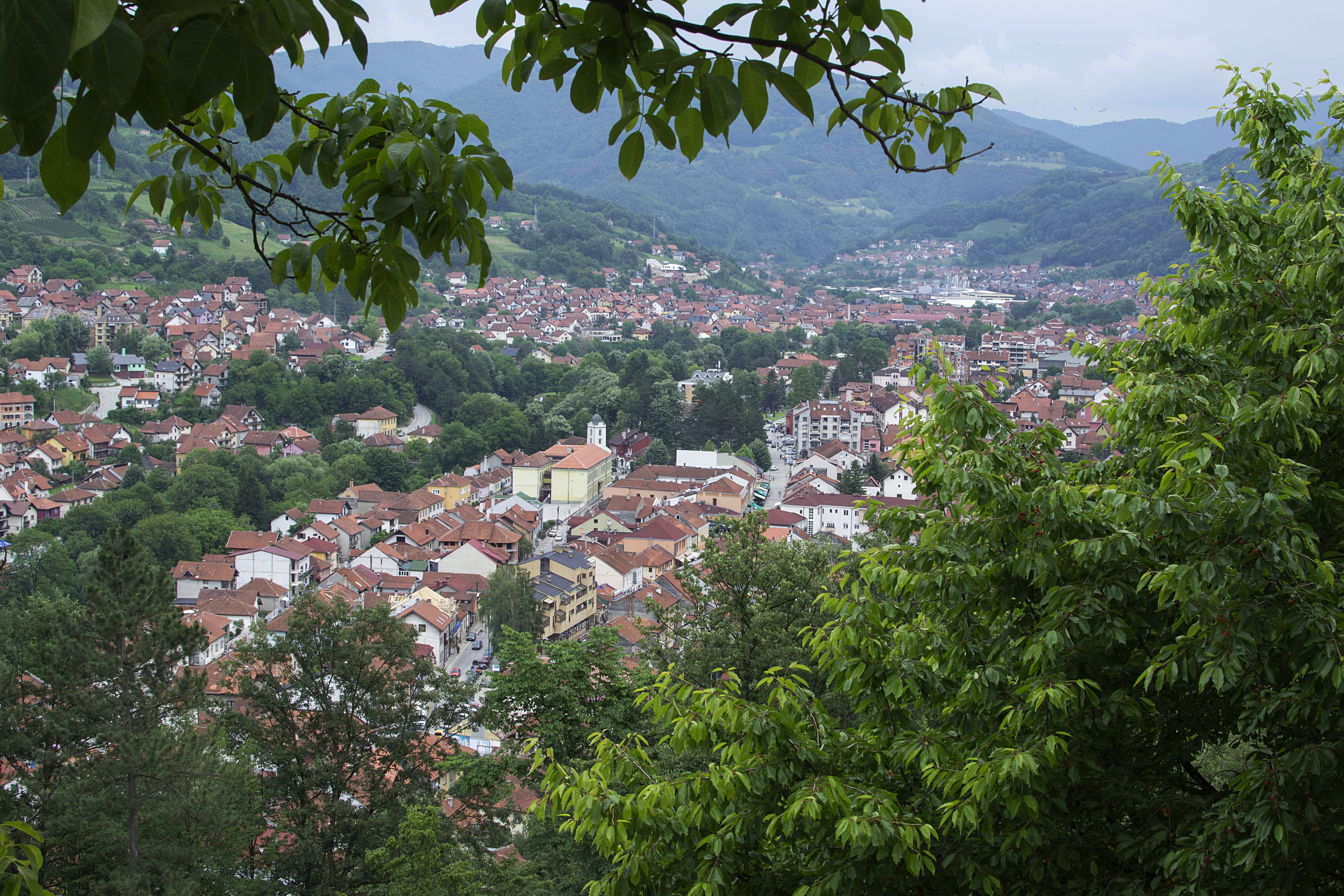
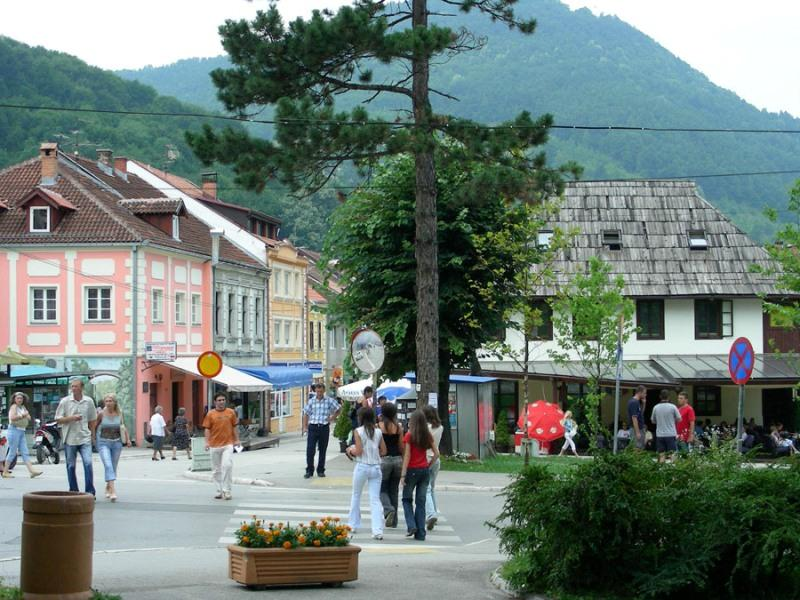
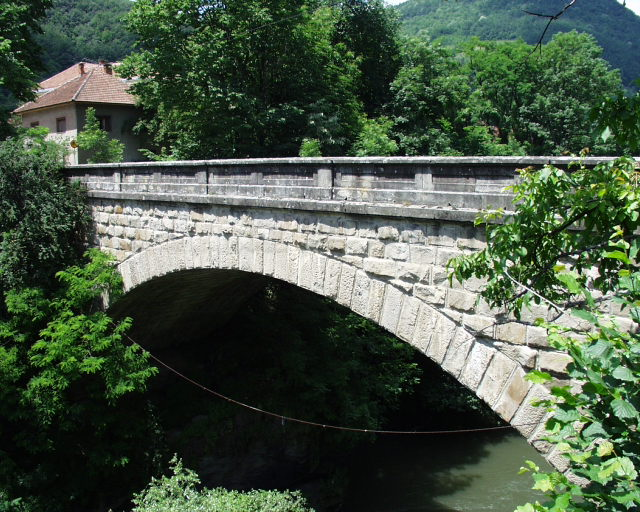
- Clockwise, from top: Town panorama, "Stone Bridge", town center promenade

- Seal
- Etymology: Saint John's Eve (Serbian: Ивањдан)
- Location within Serbia Location within Europe
- Coordinates: 43°34′52″N 20°13′47″E
- Country: Serbia
- Region: Šumadija and Western Serbia
- District: Moravica
- Settlements: 49
- Village status: 1833
- Town status: 16 June 1866

Government
  - Mayor: Momčilo Mitrović (SNS)

Area
  - Rank: 8th in Serbia
  - Town: 3.68 km^{2} (1.42 sq mi)
  - Municipality: 1,089.70 km^{2} (420.74 sq mi)
- Elevation: 468 m (1,535 ft)
- Highest elevation (Jankov Kamen peak): 1,833 m (6,014 ft)

Population (2022)
  - Rank: 50th in Serbia
  - Municipality: 27,751
  - Municipality density: 25.467/km^{2} (65.958/sq mi)
- Time zone: UTC+1 (CET)
  - Summer (DST): UTC+2 (CEST)
- Postal code: 32250; 32251; 32252; 32253; 32254; 32255; 32256; 32258; 32259
- Area code: +381(0)32
- Vehicle registration: IC
- Website: www.ivanjica.gov.rs

Ivanjica (Serbian Cyrillic: Ивањица, pronounced [ǐʋaɲitsa]) is a town and municipality located in the Moravica District of southwestern Serbia. As of 2022 census, the municipality has a population of 27,767 inhabitants. With an area of 1090 km^{2}, it is the eighth largest municipality in Serbia.

Situated in the valley of Moravica river, Ivanjica has a predominantly hilly and mountainous terrain. It is surrounded by the mountain ranges of Golija, Javor, and Mučanj, among others. Ivanjica is known for cultural event Nušićijada which is taking place in the town annually.

== History ==
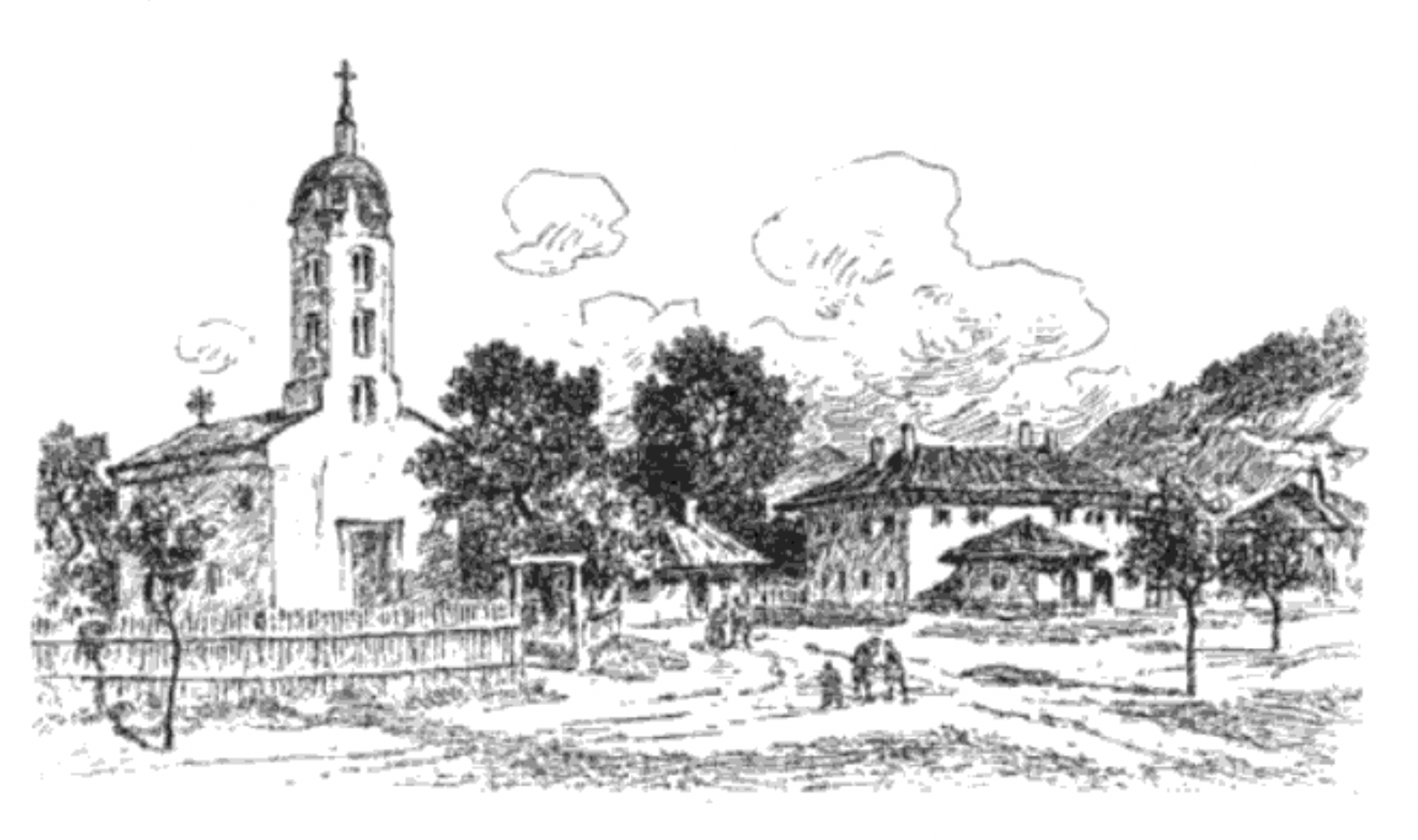
Ivanjica in 1860

Following the Serbian Revolution which took place in early 19th century, and Serbian liberation from the Ottoman Empire, Ivanjica has gained the status of village in 1833, after the Prince of Serbia, Miloš Obrenović took the area. In 1836, Orthodox church was built in town centre. Ivanjica got the status of a town on 16 June 1866 through the Prince Mihailo Obrenović's decree, thus becoming one of the first towns in the region.

With the 1878 Congress of Berlin recognition of the independence of Principality of Serbia, King Milan I founded the Kingdom of Serbia. In 1918, Kingdom of Yugoslavia was formed, following the World War I. From 1929 until the beginning of the World War II, Ivanjica was part of Drina Banovina. In August and October 1941 it was briefly captured and held by forces of Pećanac Chetniks commanded by Božidar Ćosović.

With the end of World War II, Ivanjica was part of Užice Oblast. At the time, Ivanjica was the administrative center of so-called Moravica County (Serbian Cyrillic: Моравички срез). That changed in 1963 following the adoption of the 1963 Yugoslav Constitution, when counties were replaced with regions and municipalities, thus creating the municipality of Ivanjica, as a part of Užice District. Since the founding, Ivanjica's population mostly lived in the rural areas, with only 1,532 (4.04%) living in the town, as of 1948. That began to change with the period of industrialisation which hit Ivanjica during the 1960s. That caused the rural population to move to the urban areas of municipality. Until the 1990s urban population made up to 31% of total municipality's population.

Following the Government of Serbia Enactment of 29 January 1992, Ivanjica became part of Moravica District, with the administrative center in Čačak, thus becoming more connected to the region. In 2003, a monument of Draža Mihailović, former Chetnik leader who was born in Ivanjica, was set in town center on his 110th birth anniversary.

Today, Ivanjica is a modern little town and the municipality with around 27,700 citizens. Its economy and development are based on agriculture, lumber industry and tourism.

== Geography ==
Ivanjica lies in the valley of the Moravica river. It is surrounded on all sides by mountains, including Čemerno, Radočelo, Golija, Javor, Mučanj, Crvena Gora, and Malič. Its highest elevation point is 1833 m, at the Jankov Kamen peak of Golija. The mountains in this area belong to the Dinaric Alps mountain range.

The local environment includes forests and clearings, pastures, springs and rivers, wild fruit, 'medicinal' herbs and various game.

The river system of the municipality and its neighborhood is made up of clear fast-flowing mountain rivers: the Moravica, the Studenica and the Nošnica which, together with their tributaries, curve down the hilly and mountainous terrain. There are and two small lakes: Nebeska Suza and Tičar Lake.

=== Climate ===
Ivanjica has a humid continental climate (Köppen climate classification: Dfb), that's very close to an oceanic climate (Köppen climate classification: Cfb).

Climate data for Ivanjica
Month	Jan	Feb	Mar	Apr	May	Jun	Jul	Aug	Sep	Oct	Nov	Dec	Year
Mean daily maximum °C (°F)	3.7 (38.7)	6.1 (43.0)	11.4 (52.5)	15.1 (59.2)	19.7 (67.5)	23.3 (73.9)	25.5 (77.9)	25.8 (78.4)	22.2 (72.0)	17.1 (62.8)	9.5 (49.1)	4.9 (40.8)	15.4 (59.6)
Daily mean °C (°F)	0.8 (33.4)	2.5 (36.5)	6.5 (43.7)	9.8 (49.6)	14.3 (57.7)	17.8 (64.0)	19.9 (67.8)	19.9 (67.8)	16.2 (61.2)	11.9 (53.4)	5.8 (42.4)	2.2 (36.0)	10.6 (51.1)
Mean daily minimum °C (°F)	−3.3 (26.1)	−1.5 (29.3)	1.6 (34.9)	5.1 (41.2)	9.0 (48.2)	12.3 (54.1)	13.8 (56.8)	13.5 (56.3)	10.3 (50.5)	6.8 (44.2)	2.1 (35.8)	−0.9 (30.4)	5.7 (42.3)
Average precipitation mm (inches)	66 (2.6)	59 (2.3)	62 (2.4)	72 (2.8)	95 (3.7)	88 (3.5)	78 (3.1)	67 (2.6)	69 (2.7)	75 (3.0)	85 (3.3)	77 (3.0)	893 (35)
Source: Climate-Data.org

== Settlements ==
Aside from the town of Ivanjica, the municipality of Ivanjica includes the following 48 settlements:

- Bedina Varoš
- Bratljevo
- Brezova
- Brusnik
- Budoželja
- Bukovica
- Vasiljevići
- Vionica
- Vrmbaje
- Vučak
- Gleđica
- Gradac
- Dajići
- Deretin
- Dobri Do
- Dubrava
- Erčege
- Javorska Ravna Gora
- Katići
- Klekova
- Kovilje
- Komadine
- Koritnik
- Kosovica
- Kumanica
- Kušići
- Lisa
- Luke
- Mana
- Maskova
- Medovine
- Međurečje
- Močioci
- Opaljenik
- Osonica
- Preseka
- Prilike
- Ravna Gora
- Radaljevo
- Rovine
- Rokci
- Sveštica
- Sivčina
- Smiljevac
- Čečina
- Šarenik
- Šume

== Demographics ==
Historical population
Year	Pop.	±% p.a.
1948	37,891	—
1953	40,258	+1.22%
1961	40,526	+0.08%
1971	39,233	−0.32%
1981	37,887	−0.35%
1991	36,686	−0.32%
2002	35,445	−0.31%
2011	31,963	−1.14%
2022	27,767	−1.27%

According to the latest official census done in 2011, the municipality of Ivanjica had 31,963 inhabitants. About 36.7% of the municipality's population is living in town of Ivanjica. As of 2022 census, the municipality has a population of 27,767 inhabitants.

Population density of the municipality is 25 inhabitants per square kilometer. There is a trend of population decline since the 1960s. The reasons for this trend are bad economic conditions in Serbia, negative natural increase rate and majority of the older population. Depopulation is typical for villages because of the migrations to urban and other areas. The municipality of Ivanjica has 10,388 households with 3,03 members on average, while the number of homes is 13,469.

Religion structure in the municipality of Ivanjica is predominantly Serbian Orthodox (31,541), with minorities like Atheists (26), Catholics (22), Muslims (15) and others. Most of the population speaks Serbian language (31,658).

The composition of population by gender and average age:

- Male - 16,081 (42.19 years) and
- Female - 15,882 (44.09 years).

The total of 11,595 citizens have secondary education (36.3%), while the 2,167 citizens have higher education (6.8%). Of those with higher education, 1,182 (3.7%) have university education.

=== Ethnic composition ===
Most of Ivanjica's population is of Serbian nationality (92.69%). The ethnic composition of the municipality:

Ethnic group	Population 1931	Population 1948	Population 1953	Population 1961	Population 1971	Population 1981	Population 1991	Population 2002	Population 2011	Population 2022
Serbs	-	32,597	36,154	34,161	38,919	37,331	36,111	35,021	31,507	25,723
Romani	-	-	-	2	1	10	8	33	29	27
Montenegrins	-	19	69	41	65	79	134	68	24	20
Albanians	-	-	9	10	13	16	-	-	13	10
Yugoslavs	-	-	2	1	20	265	245	32	7	9
Macedonians	-	8	14	15	17	21	-	12	13	8
Gorani	-	-	-	-	-	-	-	7	7	6
Muslims	-	1	-	3	12	5	11	6	8	4
Croats	-	13	43	11	12	24	12	9	9	3
Others	-	159	29	47	174	136	286	257	346	1,947
Total	24,820	32,797	36,320	34,291	39,233	37,887	36,686	35,445	31,963	27,751

== Culture and tourism ==
=== Cultural monuments ===
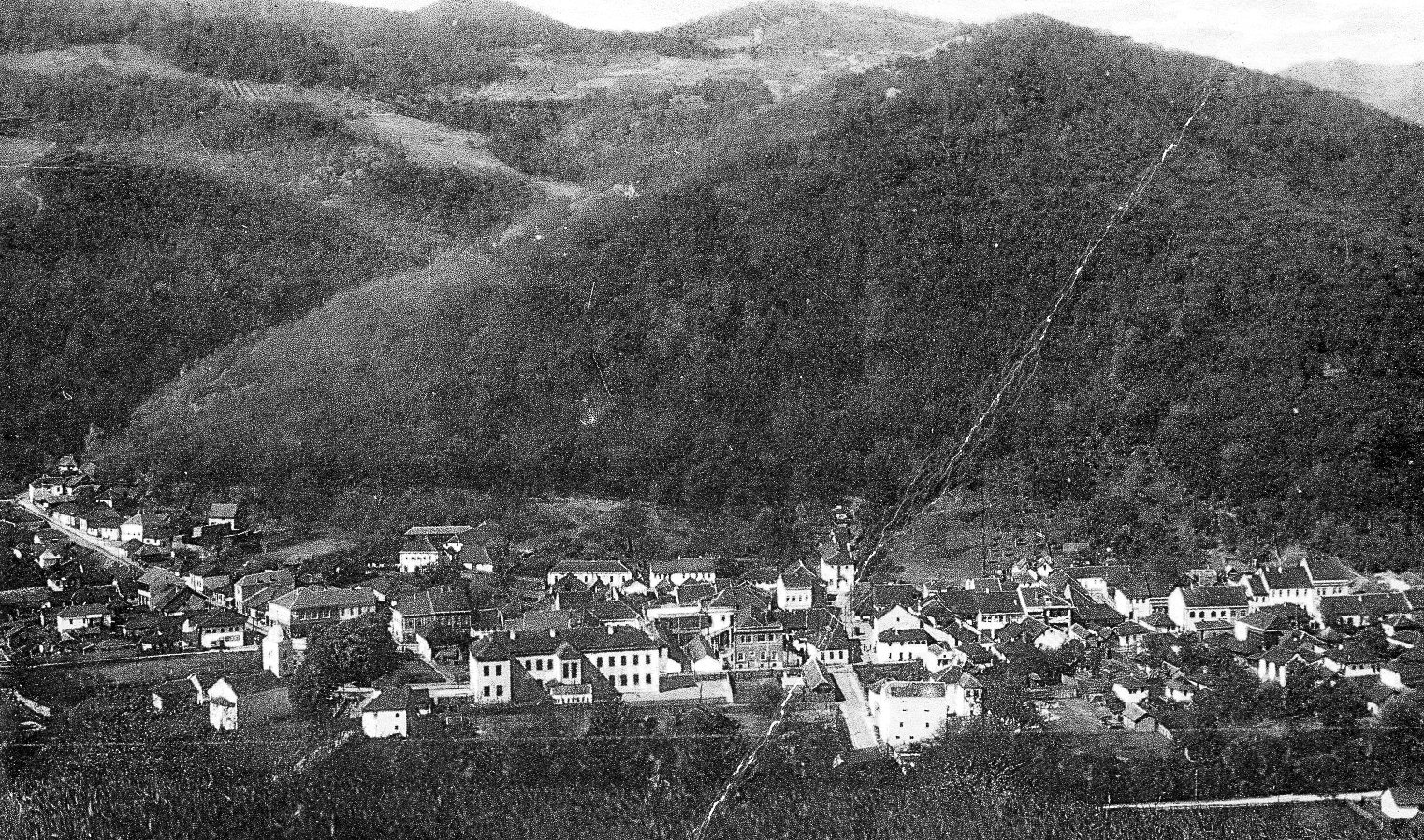
Panorama of Ivanjica in 1941.

The Old Bazaar (Stara čaršija) is located in the center of the town and was declared an immovable cultural heritage of great importance in 1987. The center of the town, especially the main street, Milinka Kušića, retains its original appearance dating back to the middle of the 19th century. Most of the structures were built after the Great Fire in 1846, which burned the town to the ground and was stopped after some houses where blown up to prevent the spread of fire. The Old Bazaar was used for a decades as backdrop for movies and TV shows in the golden-age of Yugoslavian cinematography. Promotion of the Old Bazaar as a place for making films started with Soja Jovanović making the first version of Branislav Nušić's Sumnjivo lice, in the 1950s. Later Zdravko Šotra made the TV show Više od igre, and after that, the movies Sok od šljiva and Užička republika. The 19th century ambiance of the area was desirable for these films, and Ivanjica was named "Little Hollywood".

There are several cultural monuments in the area of the Old Bazaar:

- Jeremić House - one of the oldest structures in the Old Bazaar, a two-floor building that was one of the twelve buildings saved after fire. The ground floor used to be a manufacturing workshop, while the upper floor functioned as a living space. It is located at the end of boulevard and is one of the symbols of Ivanjica.
- Church of St. Emperor Constantine and Empress Helena - immediately after the town was founded, around 1836, construction of the town church started and constructed within three years, with the donations from locals. The first restoration of the church was in the 1850s, and an artist from the time period, Dimitrije Posniković, painted it in 1862. Authentic iconostases were saved and remain today.
- Stone Bridge - at the end of the 19th century a single-arched bridge was constructed. The project was designed by engineer Milenko Trudić, and the construction work was by Blagoje Luković from Ivanjica. Stone for the construction was transported from a mine in Rašići. According to local stories, a lack of cement called for the use of 30 thousand chicken eggs to keep the stones together. At the time it was the only single-arched bridge in that part of the Balkans, for which a crossed-wedges system of construction was used. The length of the arches which connect the two coasts is 25 meters. During construction four people died. In their honor, a monument was built in Ivanjica cemetery. Bridge construction ended in 1906.
- Kušića han - in the area of the Old Bazaar there is also this object as a symbol of the rural construction of the Moravica area. It is built in mountain style from wood and stone. It used to be a doss-house for travelling traders, which were passing through on the way from Raška and Zlatibor.
- Monument of Revolution - it stands across from the Kušića han. The author of this monument is Yugoslav painter Đorđe Andrejević Kun, who was aided by Nada Hude, Miloš Gvozdenović and Ljuba Lah. Records about these artists were saved on a panel on the north side of the monument. The monument is shaped in a slightly curved semi-cylindrical reversed trapeze. It is installed on a rectangular pedestal made from white marble. On the front side there is a mosaic illustration of revolutionaries in a battle storm, made from small ceramic panels. From each side there are marble planters. The mosaic does not contain a written epitaph, only an engraved inscription in marble "1941-1945". The monument was unveiled in 1957.
- Moravica Hydroelectric power plant - built in 1911, it started working as the ninth hydro power plant in Serbia. Hydro power plants had 260 hp and illuminated only the town. Siemens generator was transported in Ivanjica on steer harness, which has no railway even today. In 1936, a concrete breakwater was built 9m height and 25m width. In 2011, the appearance of the hydro-power plant was changed, along with a view of a waterfall.
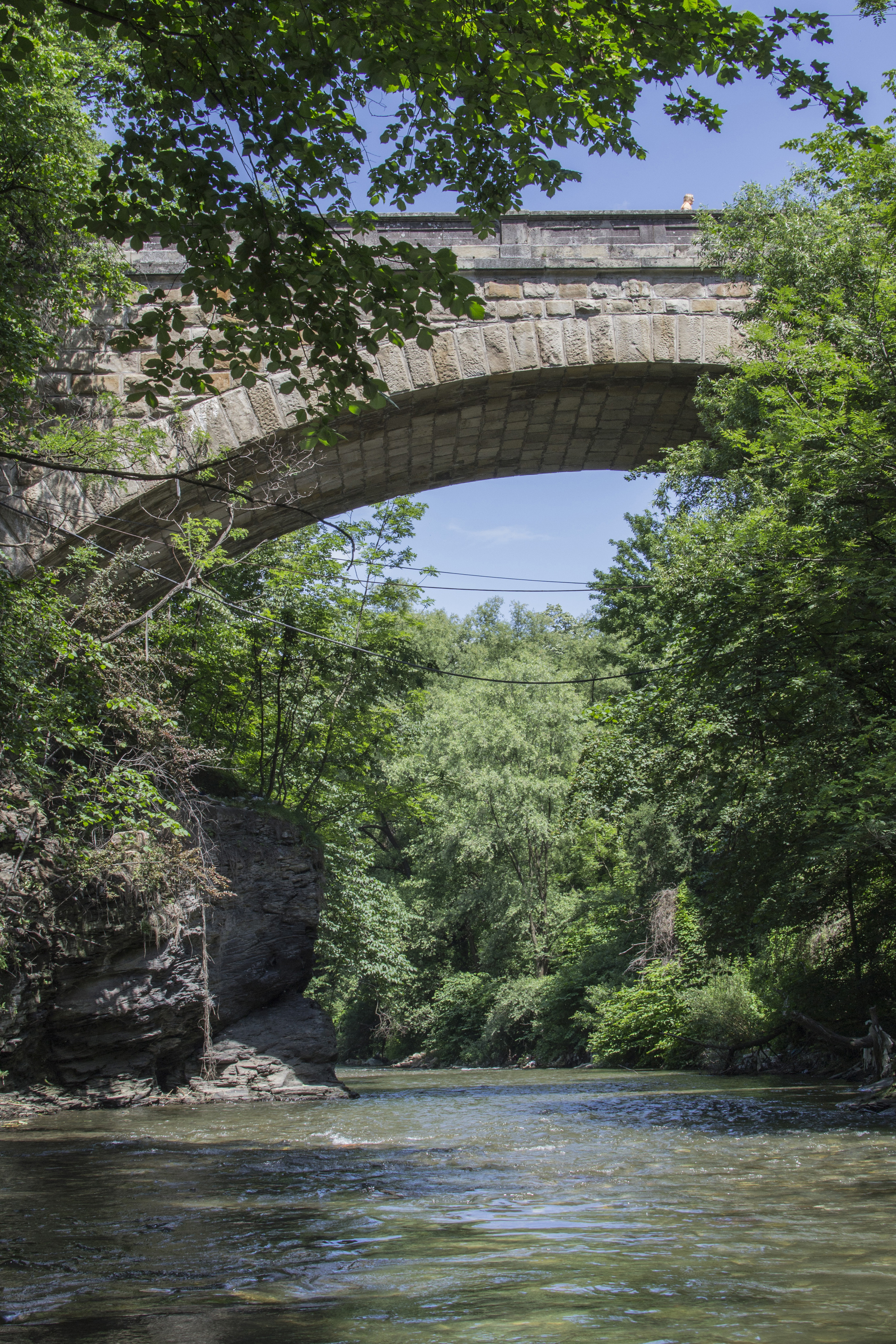
The Stone Bridge

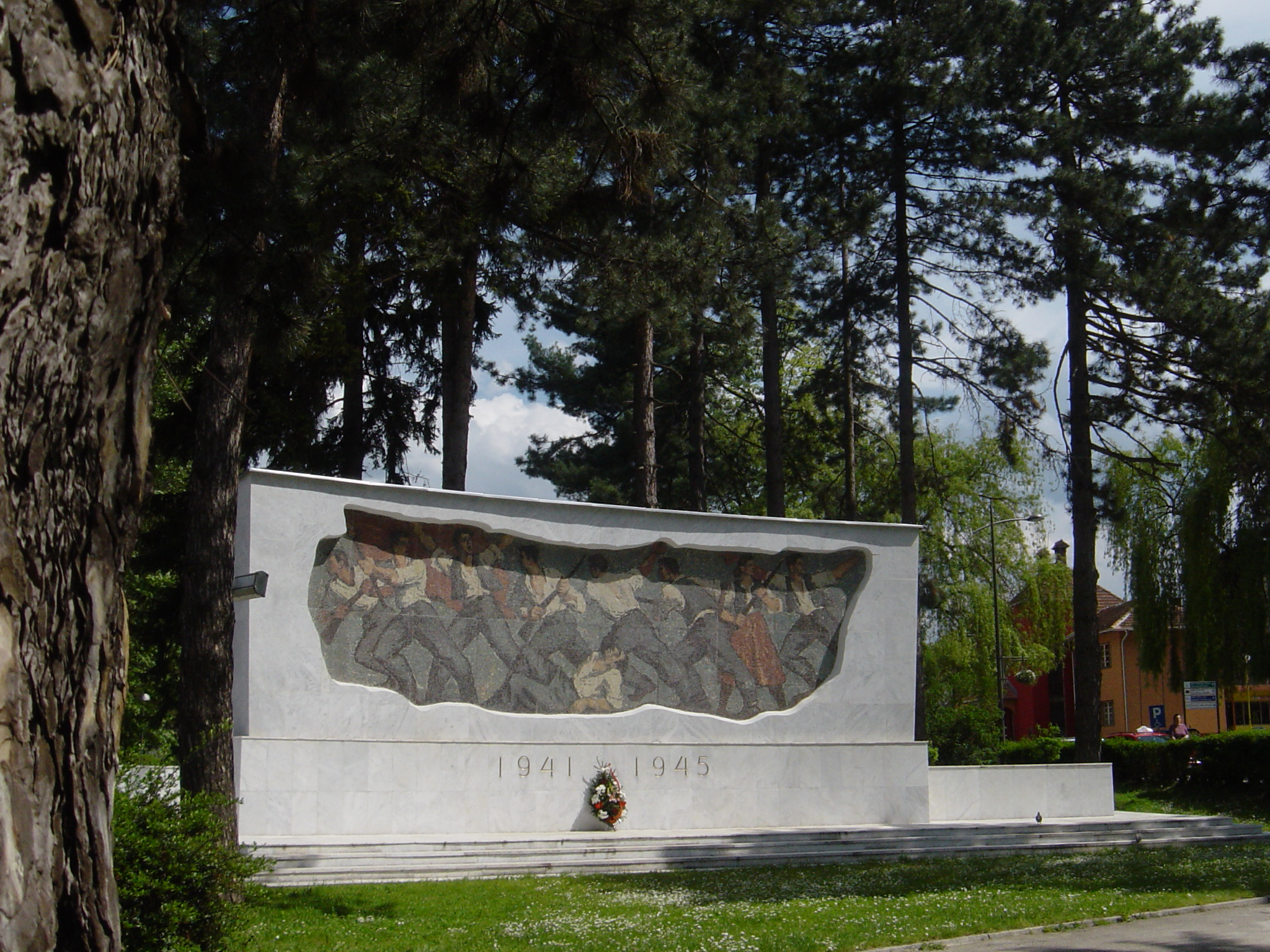
Monument of revolution

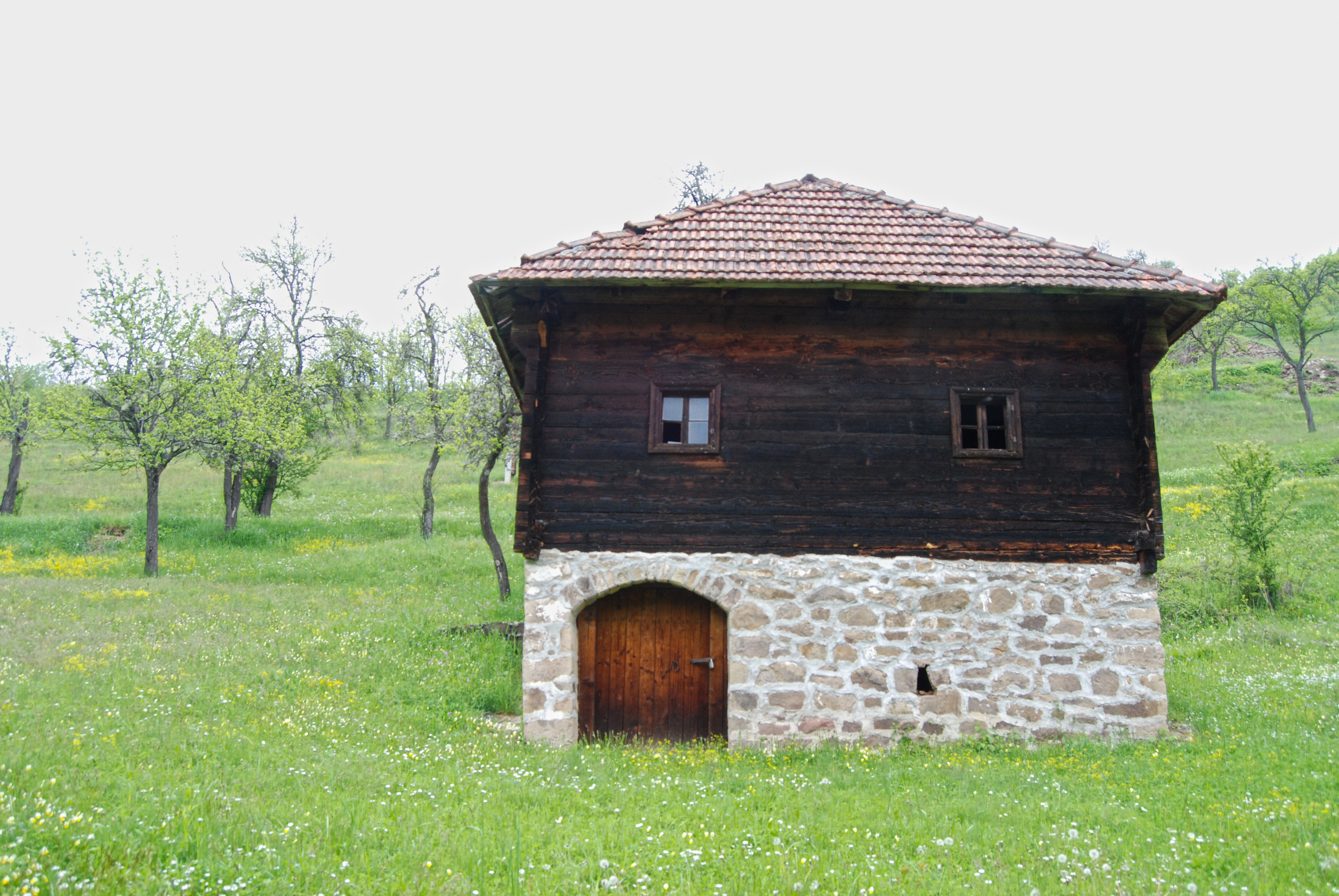
House of Venijamin Marinković

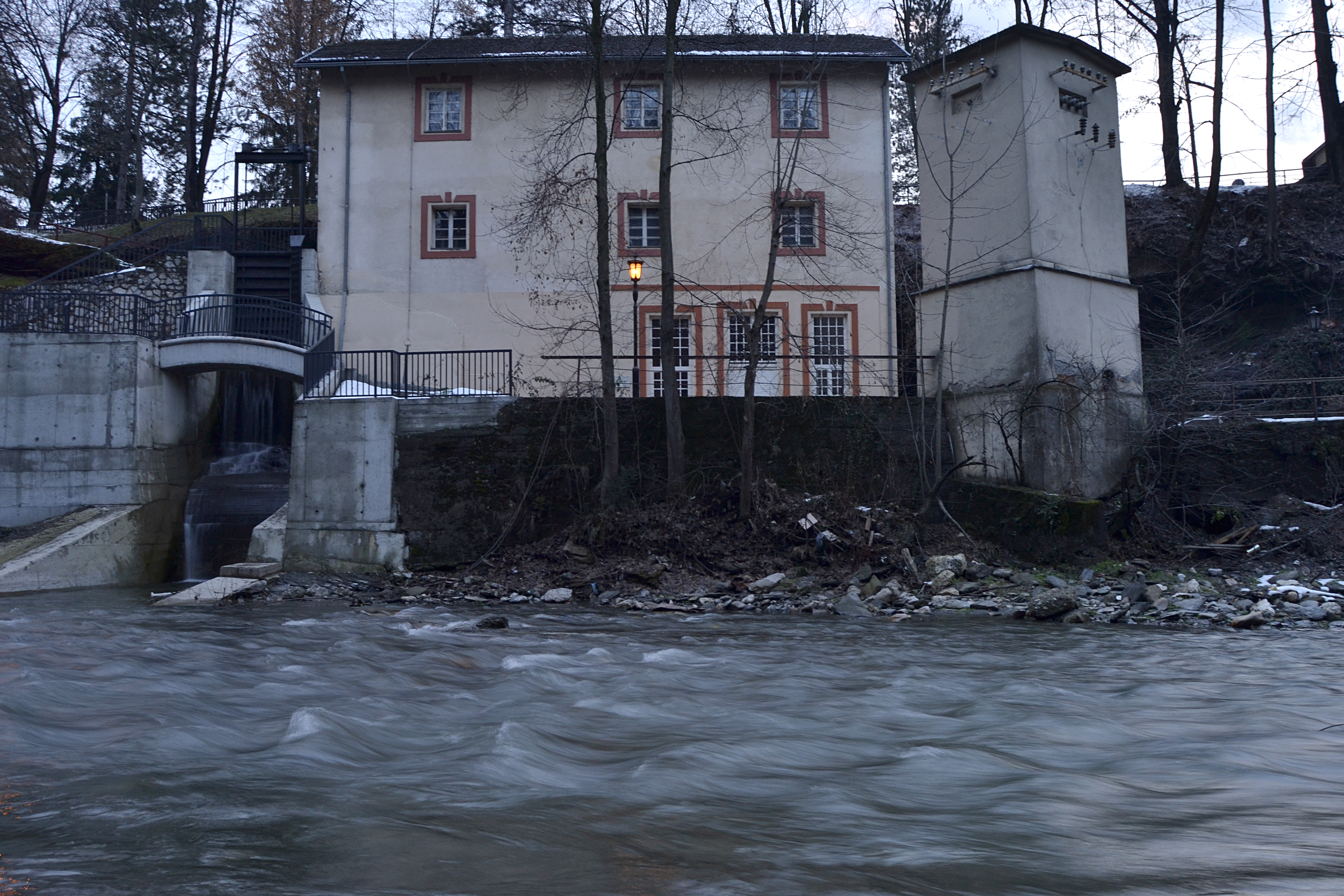
Moravica Hydroelectric power plant

=== Culture institutions and events ===
The main cultural institutions in the area include the Ivanjica Culture Centre and the Svetislav Vulović Library.

Some of cultural events are: Hunters' Fair and Wolf Hunt, Parade of Folk Creative Work - Sounds of Golija, Motorcycle Meetings in Ivanjica, Most Beautiful Love Poem Competition, If May Were All the Time, Parade of Reciters and others.

In 2010, cultural event Nušićijada was renewed by initiative of citizen organization "KudeS" from Ivanjica.

=== Tourism ===
The beginnings of the development of tourism in Ivanjica municipality are connected with the 1930s when Ivanjica was proclaimed to be a spa and a climatic place.

Tourists visiting the Ivanjica municipality are drawn by its natural and cultural resources, history and tradition, the identity of numerous sites and the cordiality of Ivanjica's hosts. Ivanjica has a number of tourism sites, including those supporting sports, hunting and fishing, excursion, congress, festival and event tourism. This municipality was proclaimed to be the first air spa in Serbia in January 2000, while Golija Mountain is Biosphere reserve under the UNESCO protection. The municipality has around 1000 beds in classified facilities and around 200 beds in village households, in the town and in the suburbs.

In 1978, the Institute for Specialized Rehabilitation was opened and it operates as a state institution which has both medical and tourist character. Its core activity is medical rehabilitation and provision of services based on recreational medical tourism. Air spa of Ivanjica spreads on 2,165 hectares with 7 hectares belonging to the Institute for Specialized Rehabilitation.

Ivanjica also has several transport links to the Serbian Orthodox Church monasteries of Pridvorica (25 km), Kovilje (28 km) and Studenica (41 km).

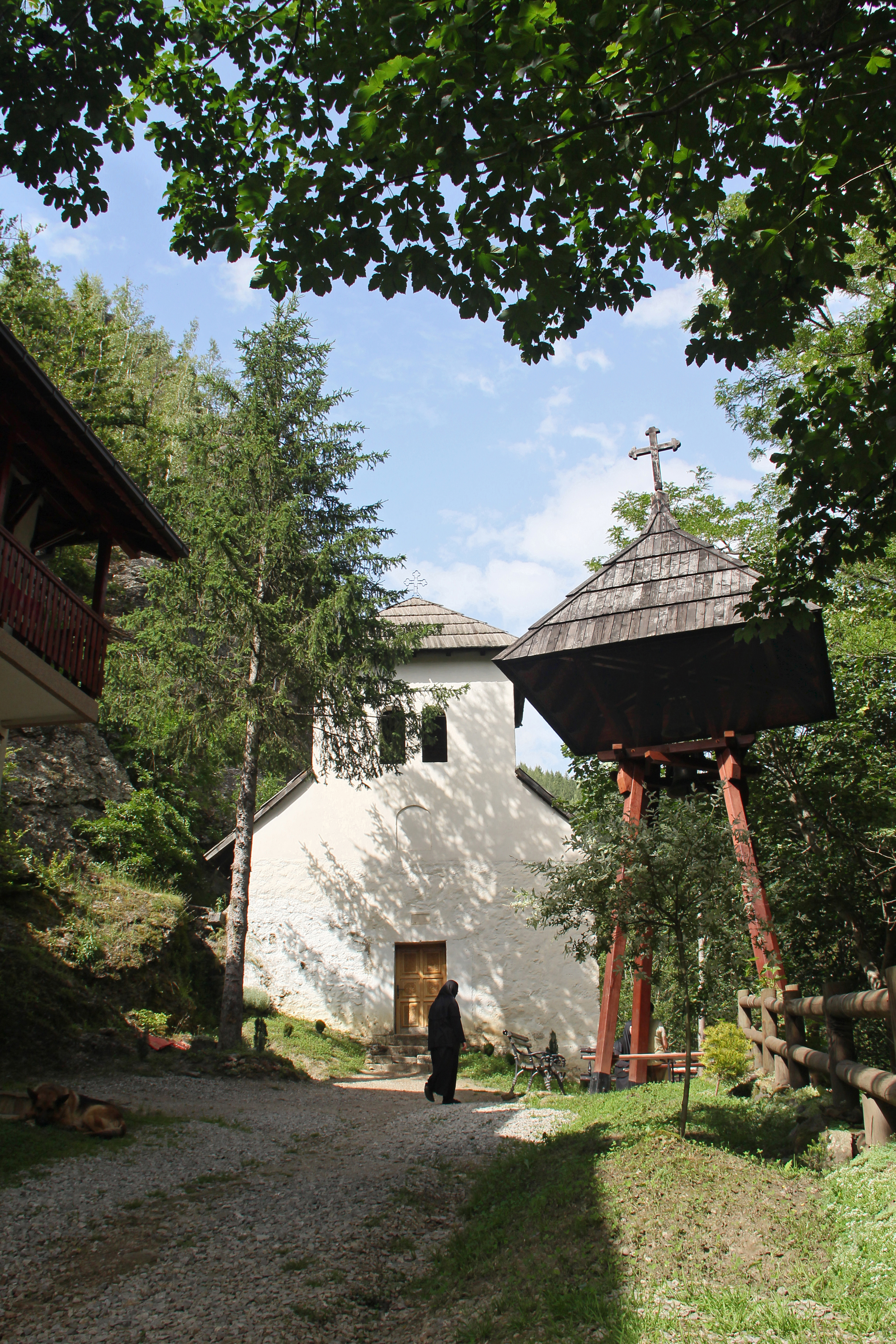
Kovilje Monastery

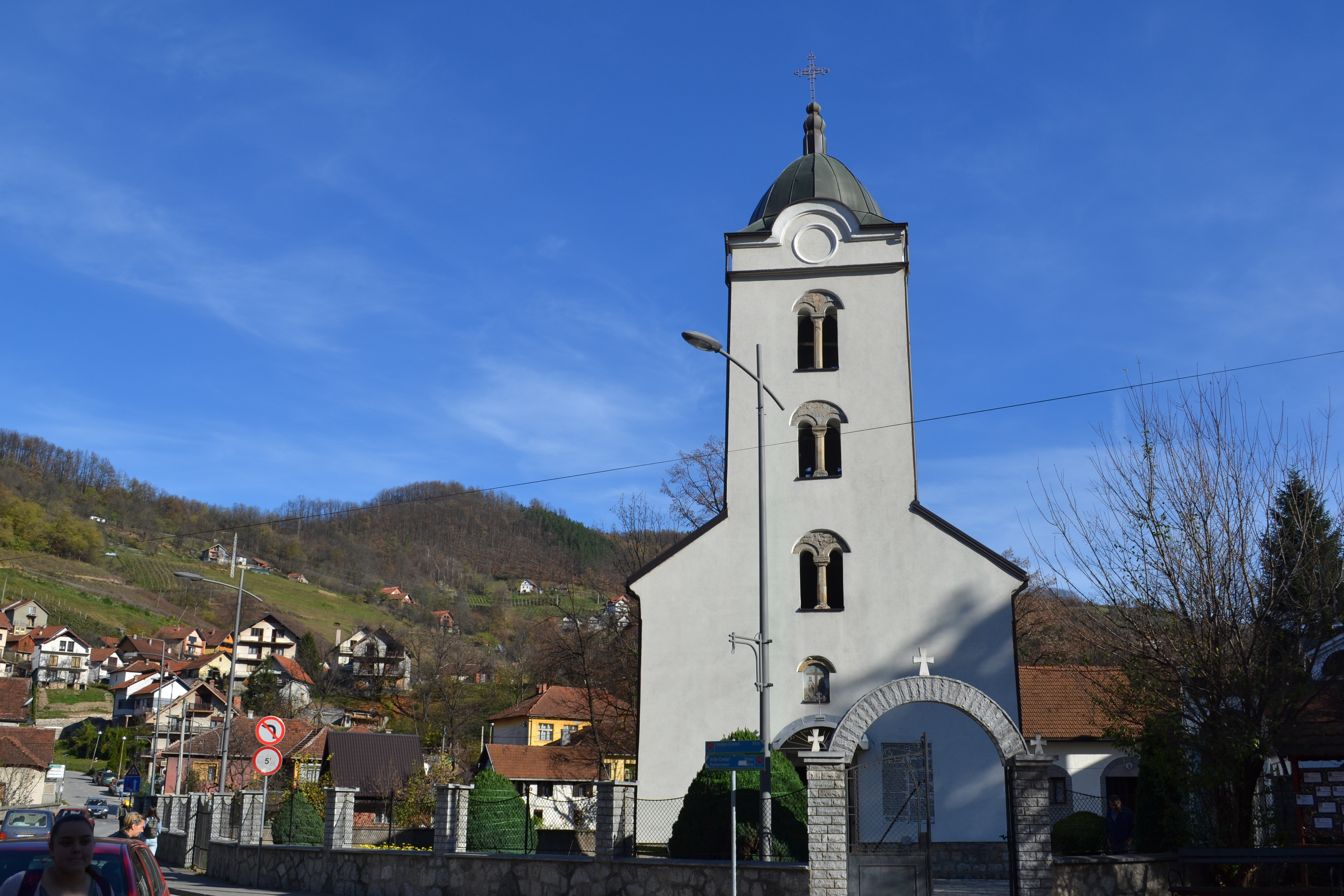
Church of Saints Emperor Constantine and Empress Helena

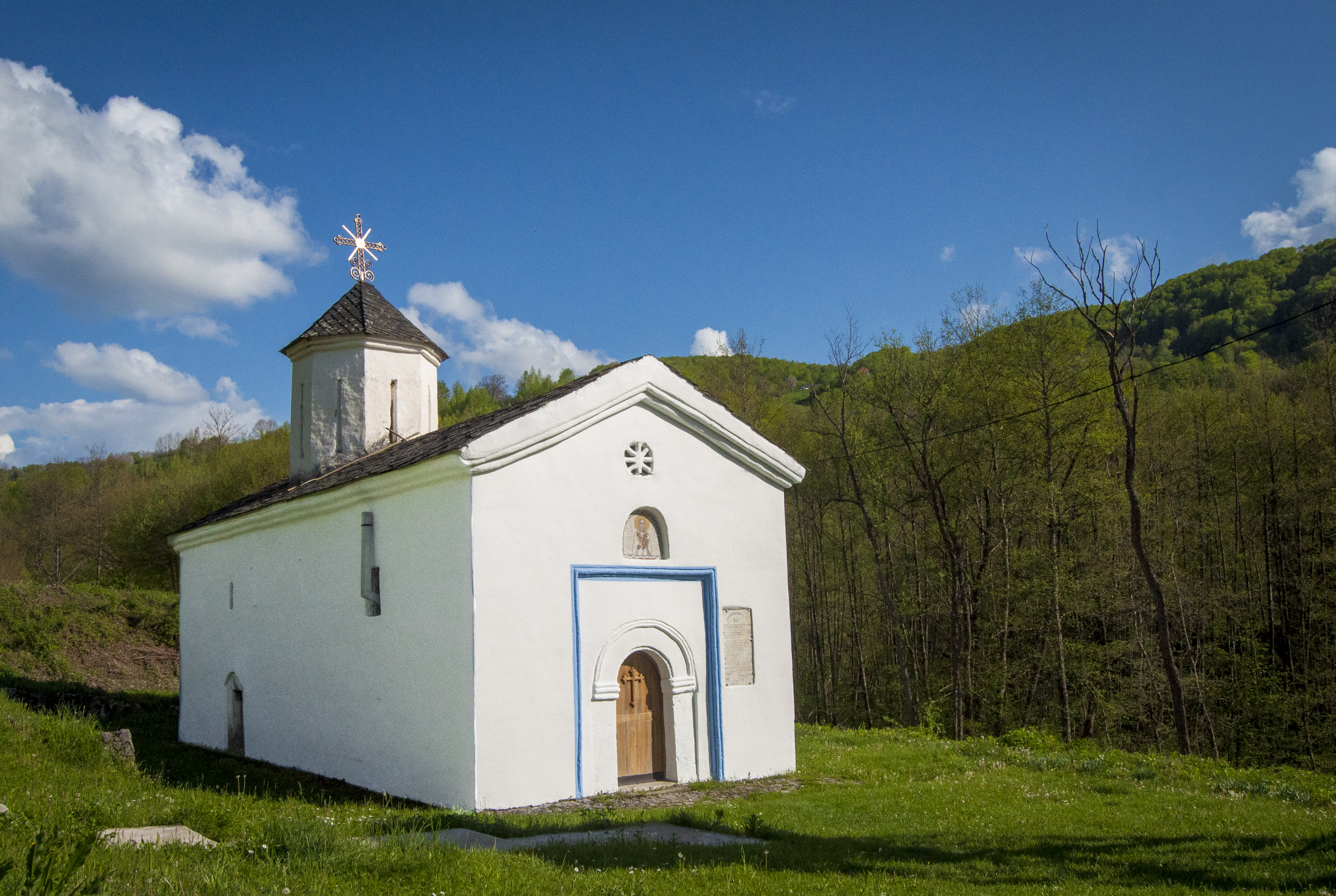
Saint Nicholas' Church

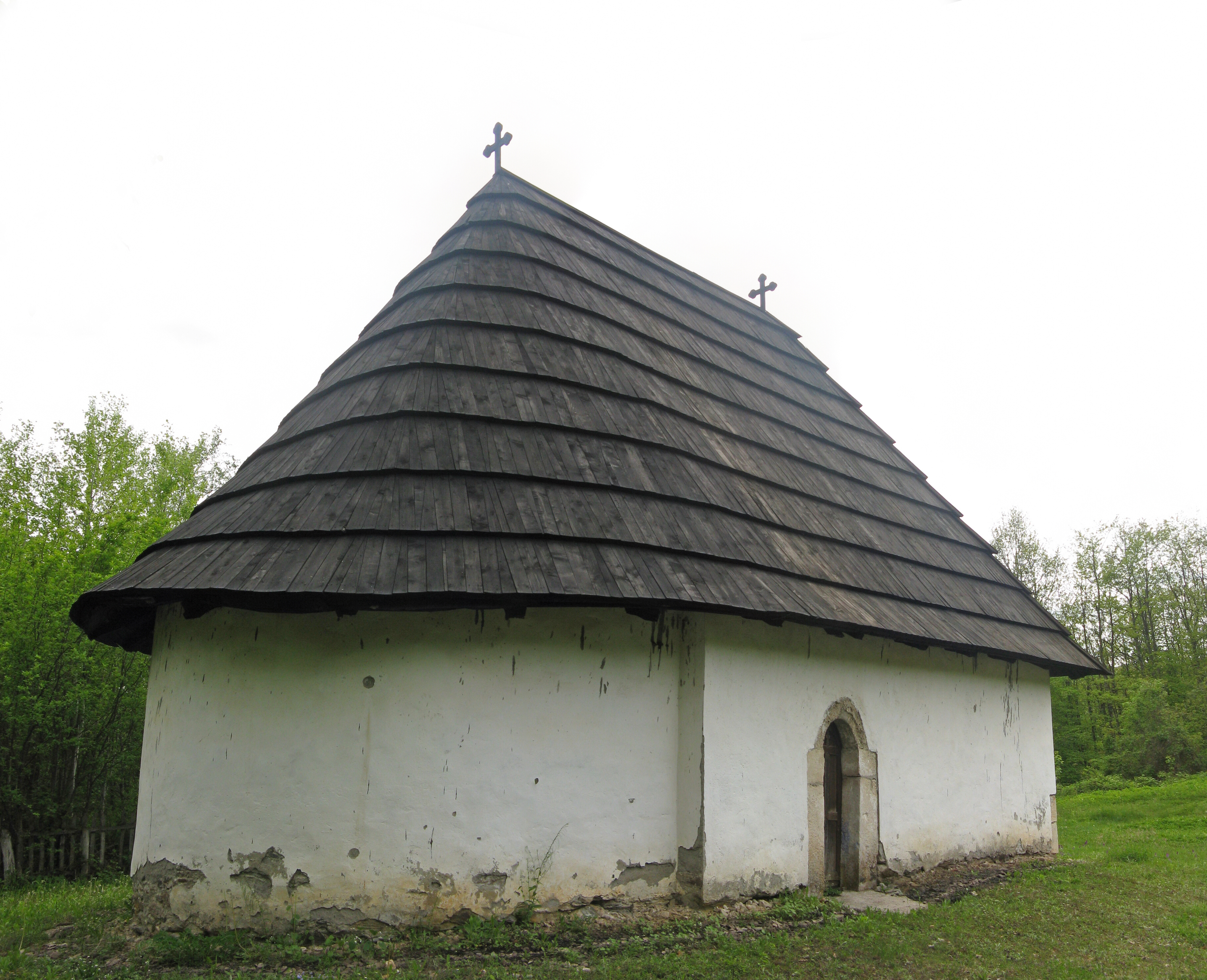
Kosovica Church

== Economy and infrastructure ==
The municipality of Ivanjica, with a total area of 1090 km^{2}, has 49.54% under forests, 47% of arable land and only 3.40% of non-arable land. The economy of Ivanjica municipality is typified by the processing industry, lumber processing, production of textile products and production of raspberry, blackberry and potato.

As of 2012, Ivanjica has a total of 7,728 registered agricultural entities (farmsteads). The municipality has large potato and raspberry plantations in which many locals are employed. With 1,800 hectares of raspberry plantations (as of 2017), together with neighboring municipality of Arilje, Ivanjica is the biggest producer of raspberries in Serbia. With 1,000 hectares, potato plantations are the second most cultivated culture in Ivanjica.

During the 1960s many large textile enterprises were opened in Ivanjica, but their production was severely hit during the 1990s international sanctions on FR Yugoslavia.

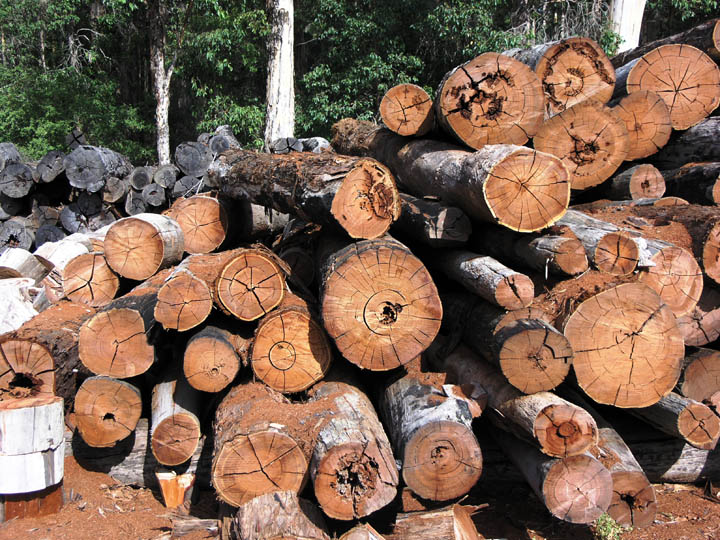
Lumber industry

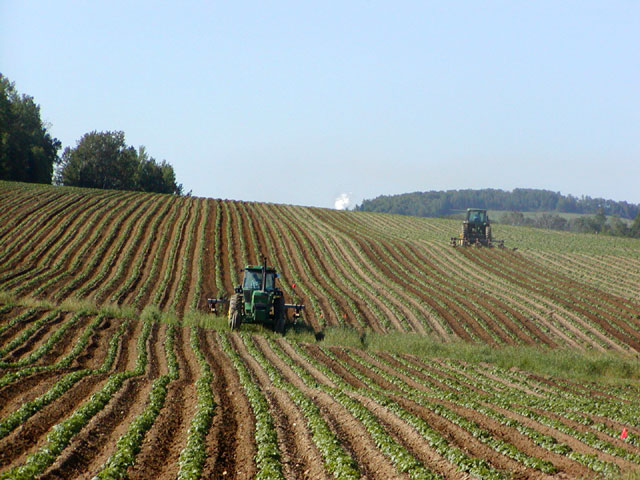
Potato farming

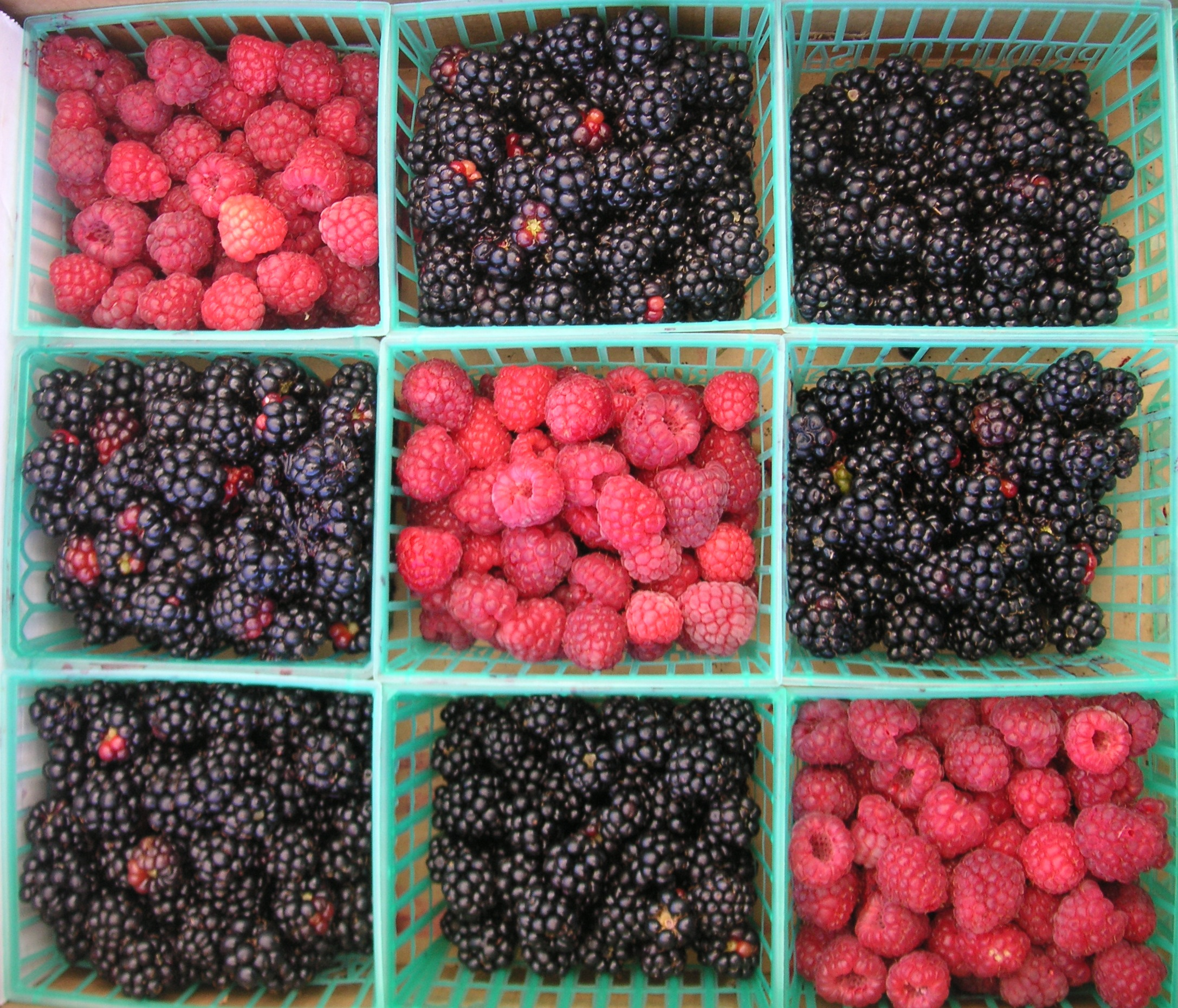
Raspberry and blackberry farming

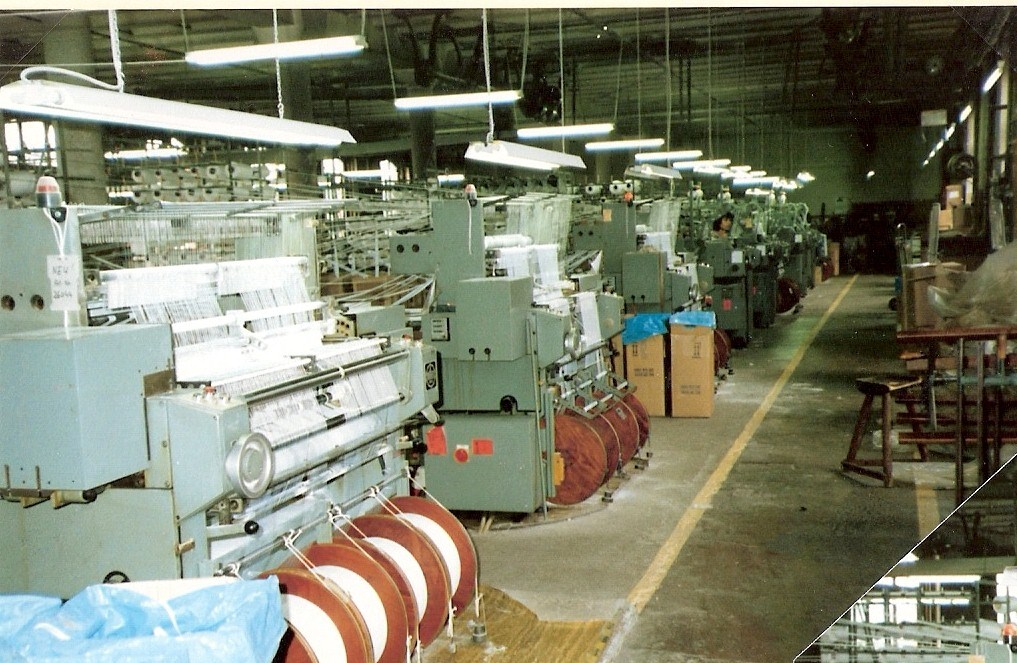
Textile manufacturing

Historical statistics

In 1988, Ivanjica had 11,300 employed people (on 37,887 inhabitants), of which 7,100 were employed in processing industry and mining sectors. In 2017, it had 7,471 employed people (on 31,963 inhabitants), of which 2,991 were employed in processing industry and mining sectors.

Ivanjica belongs to group of economically underdeveloped part of Serbia, with the level of GDP in the range of 60% to 80% of the national average. Coverage of imports by exports is 92%. There are 362 active enterprises in the municipality of Ivanjica. Small enterprises make 95% of the total number of enterprises.

Economic preview

The following table gives a preview of total number of registered people employed in legal entities per their core activity (as of 2022):

Activity	Total
Agriculture, forestry and fishing	361
Mining and quarrying	-
Manufacturing	3,278
Electricity, gas, steam and air conditioning supply	40
Distribution of water and water waste management	82
Construction	548
Wholesale and retail trade, repair of motor vehicles and motorcycles	973
Transportation and storage	598
Accommodation and food services	358
Information and communication	104
Financial and insurance activities	71
Real estate activities	14
Professional, scientific and technical activities	239
Administrative and support service activities	61
Public administration and defense; compulsory social security	285
Education	482
Human health and social work activities	456
Arts, entertainment and recreation	114
Other service activities	262
Individual agricultural workers	307
Total	8,634

=== Infrastructure ===
The municipality of Ivanjica has 84.47 kilometers (as of 2017) of state roads class I, the most in Moravica District, mostly because of its size. It also has 134.3 kilometers of state road class II and 170 kilometers of local roads.

Ivanjica lies on State Road 21 (M 21) which intersects with A2 motorway near the Požega's village of Gorobilje, some 35 kilometers from Ivanjica. The southern sections of this motorway are in the planning phase, and the road is planned to go through Ivanjica as well in the future.

Užice (60 km), Zlatibor (87 km)	Arilje (30 km), Požega (42 km), Čačak (51 km), Belgrade (203 km)	Kraljevo (70 km), Kragujevac (104 km)
Sarajevo (248 km)		Kruševac (134 km), Niš (218 km)
Sjenica (63 km), Nova Varoš (70 km), Podgorica (227 km)		Novi Pazar (88 km)

== Sport ==
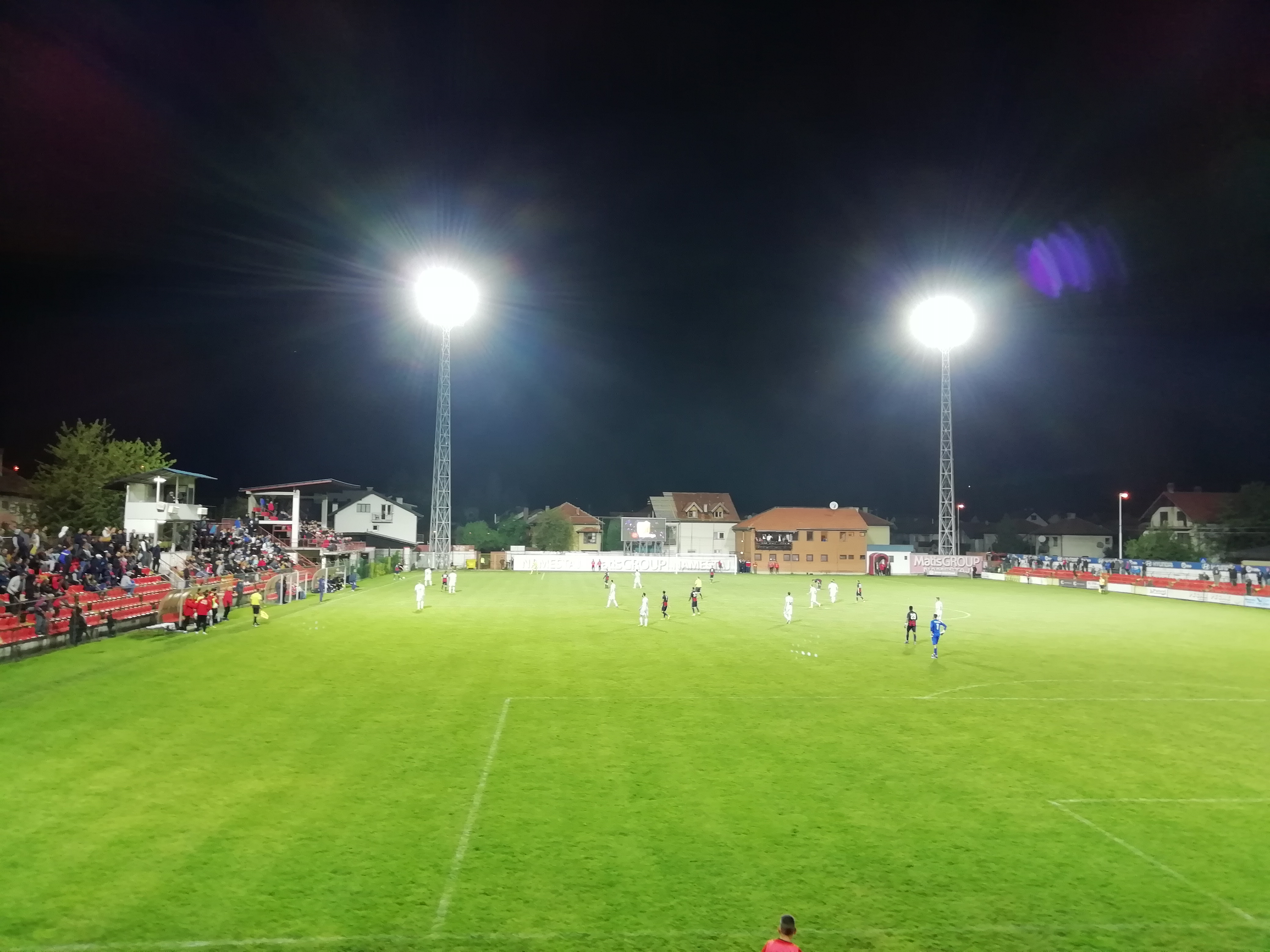
Ivanjica Stadium at night

There are 28 sports clubs in the municipality of Ivanjica. The dominant sports are football, basketball, volleyball, archery and winter sports. According to results, the most successful sport club is a football club FK Javor Ivanjica, which was founded in 1912 and in 2012 celebrated its centenary from the club founding. The club is a regular top-flight club (of the top-tier Serbian SuperLiga) over the last 25 seasons (since 2002). The other popular sports club is OKK Ivanjica basketball club, playing in the lower national league of Serbia (as of 2026).

As of 2010, on the territory of Ivanjica municipality there are 6 football fields, 2 indoor swimming pools, 2 outdoor swimming pools, 3 gyms, one air rifle range, 29 outdoor fields for recreation, one athletics track, one chess hall and 2 sports halls.

== Gallery ==
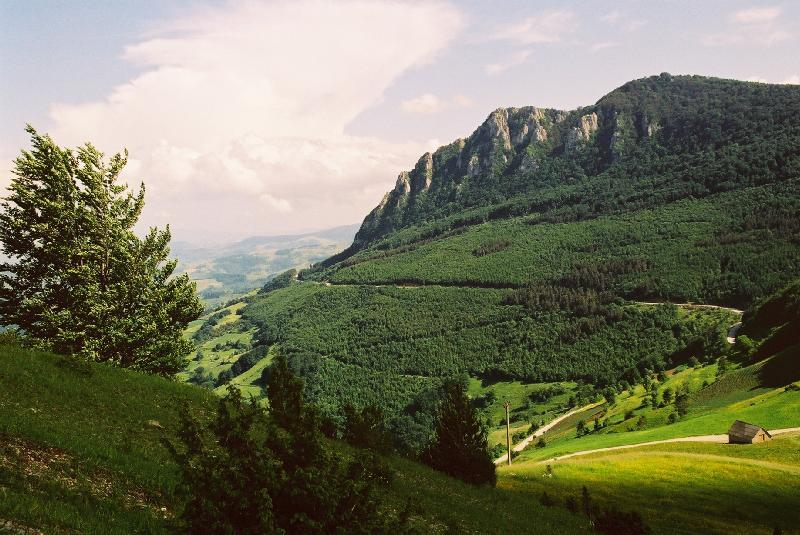
Landscape of Ivanjica municipality

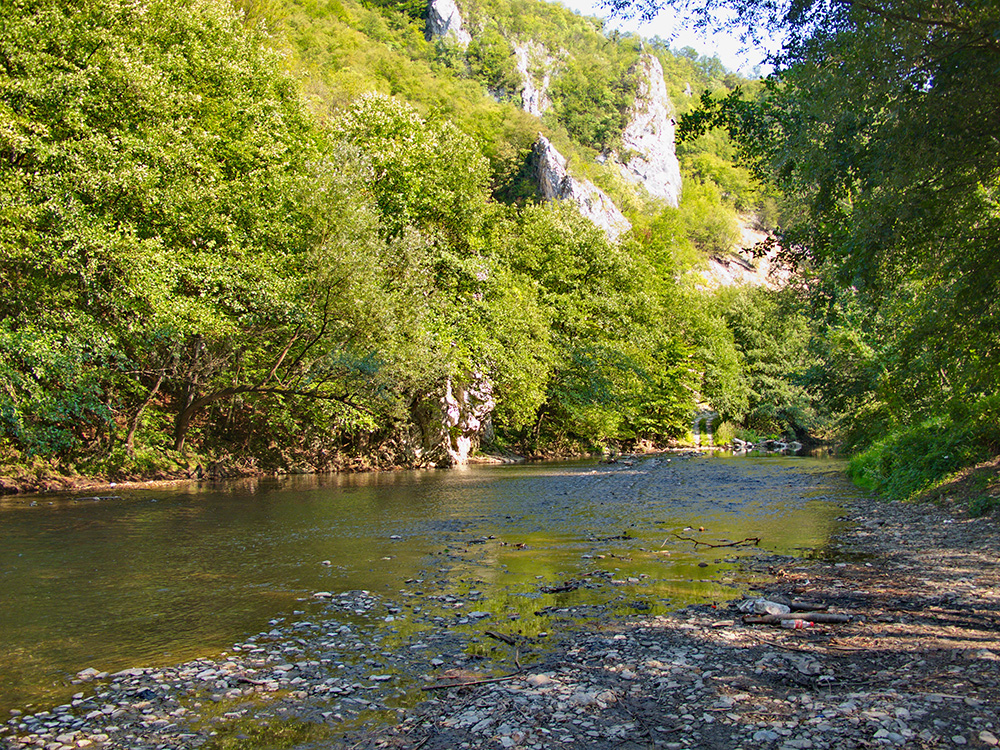
Moravica river

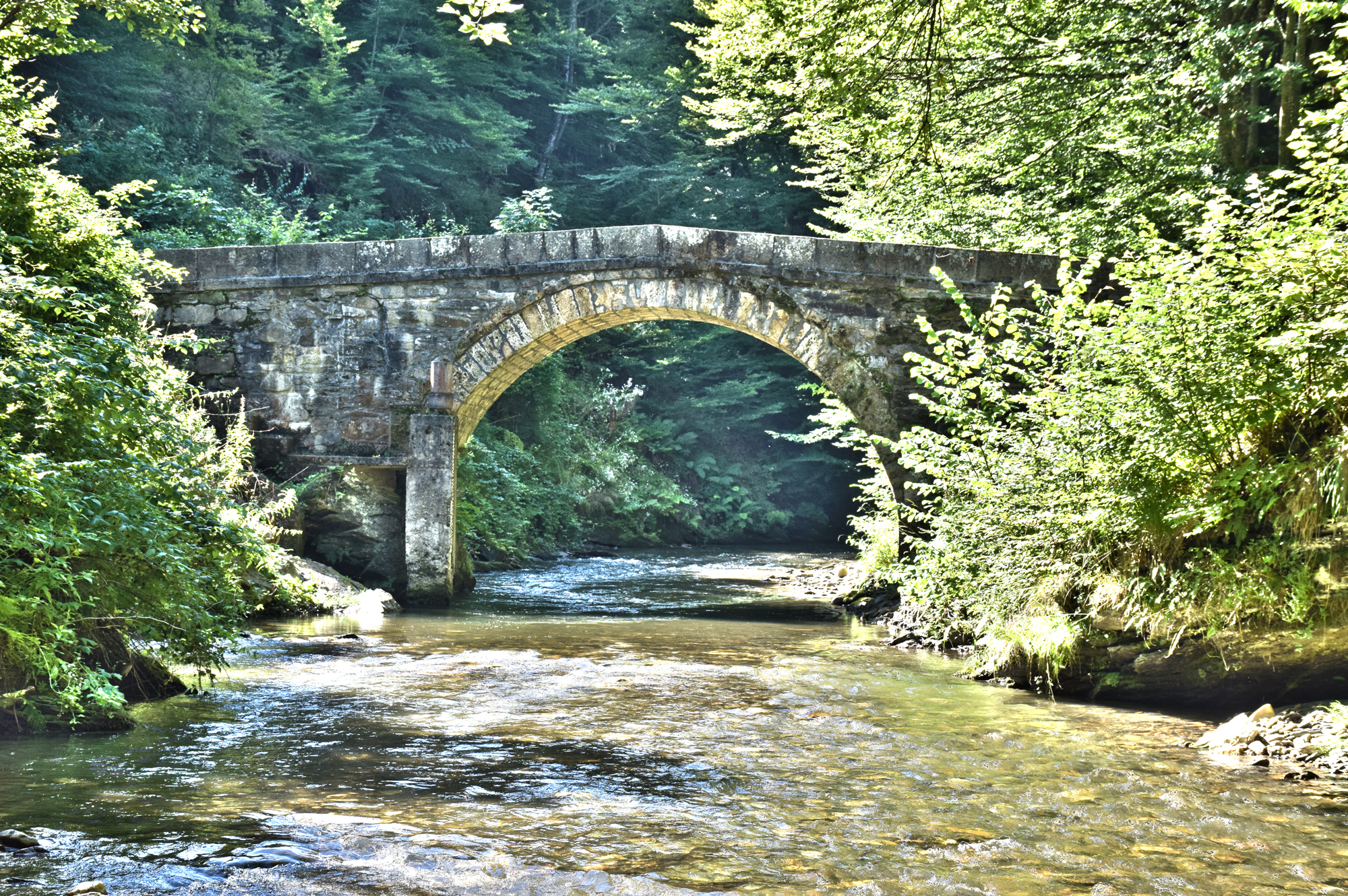
Roman bridge on Moravica

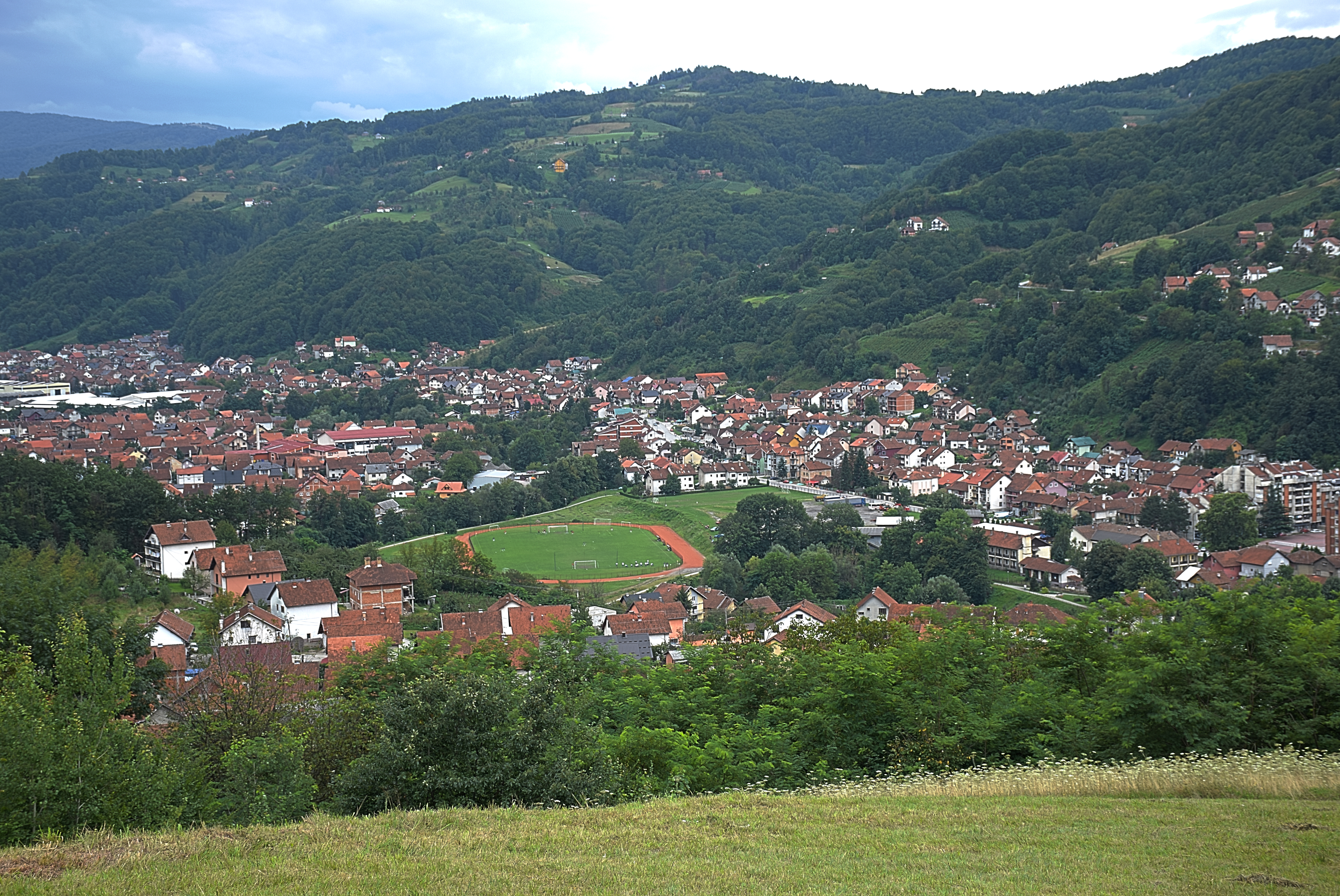
View on Ivanjica

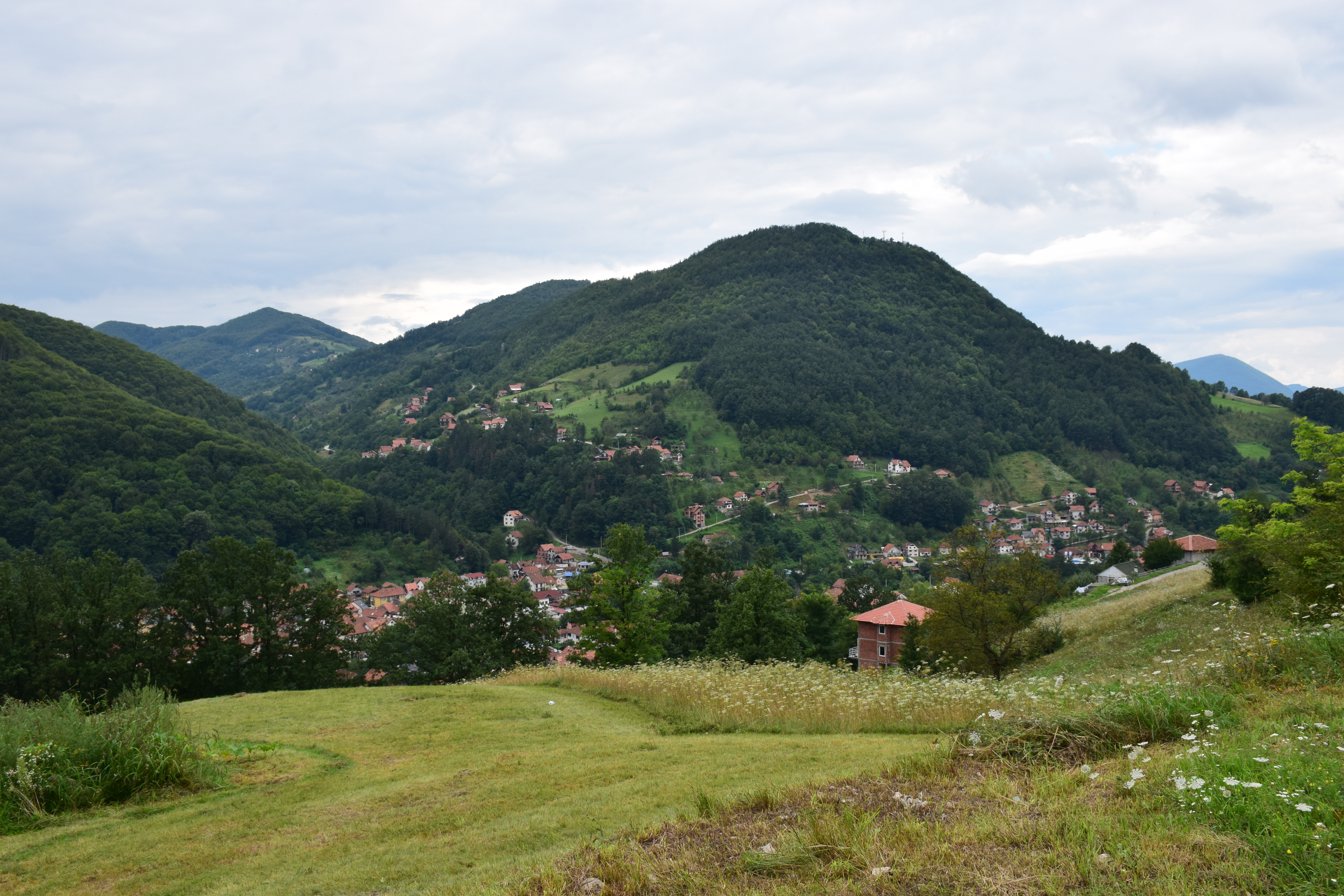
Hill above town

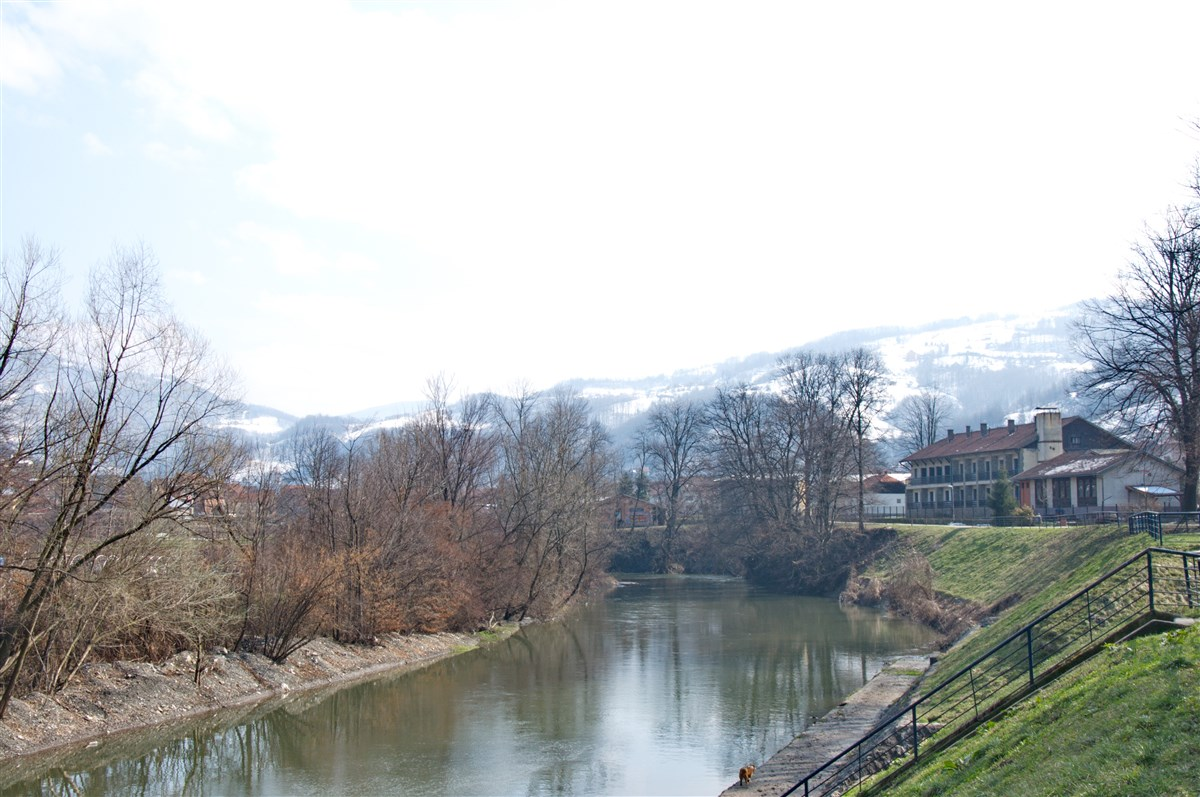
Town park in winter

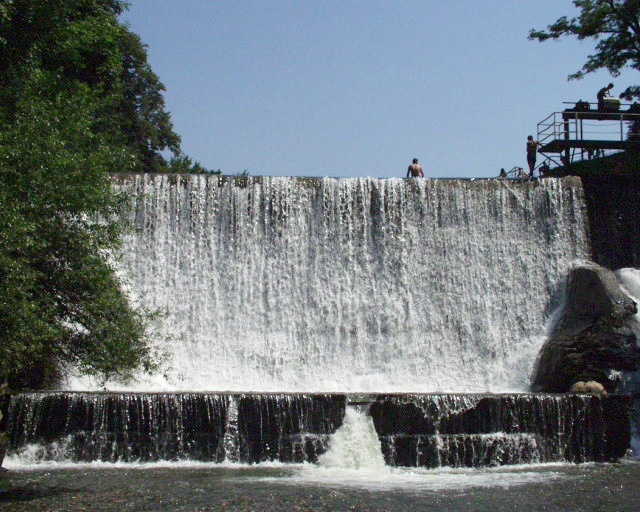
Old look of Moravica Waterfall

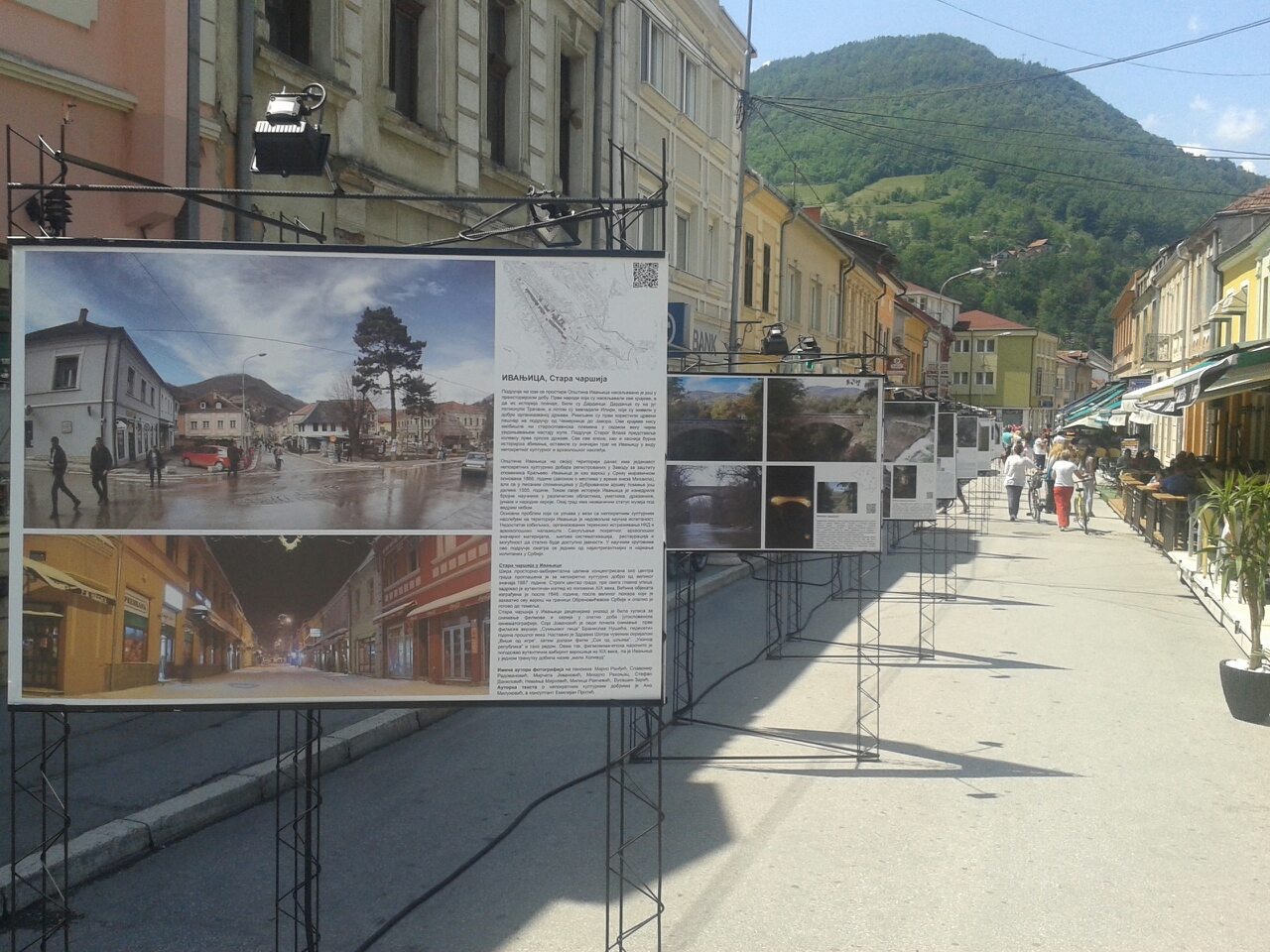
Town center street in Museum Night edition

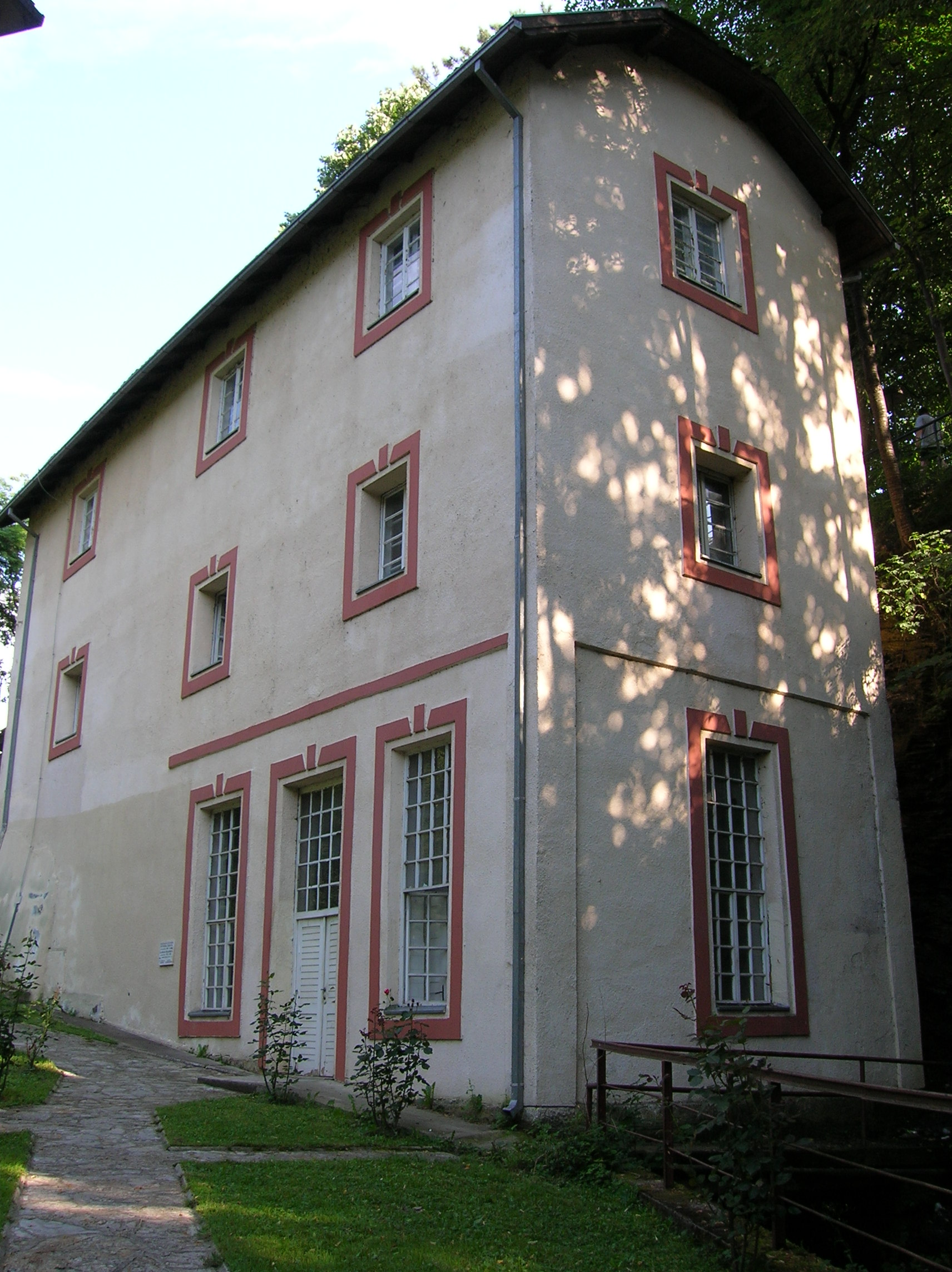
Old Hydroelectric Power Plant

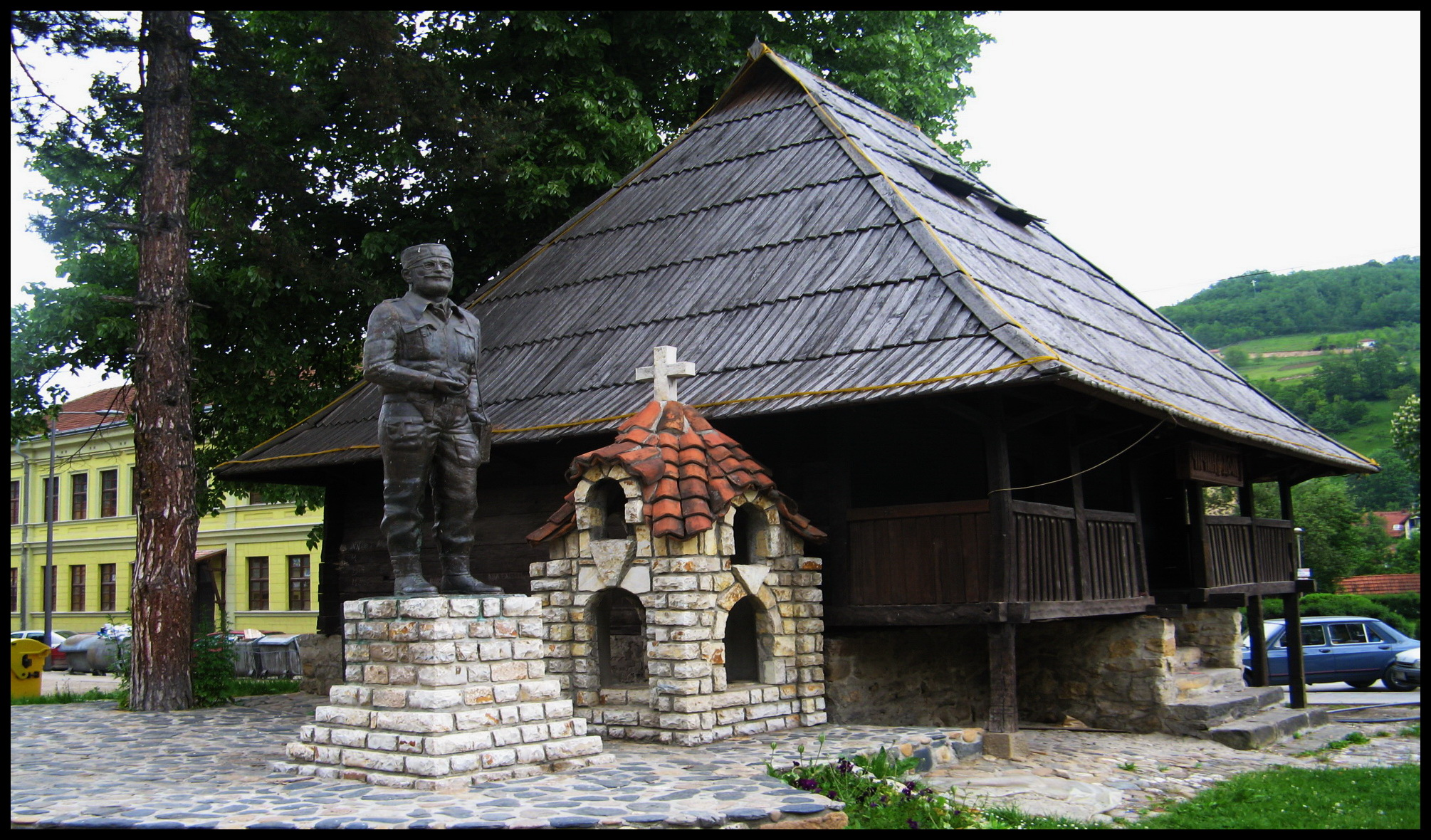
House of Draža Mihailović

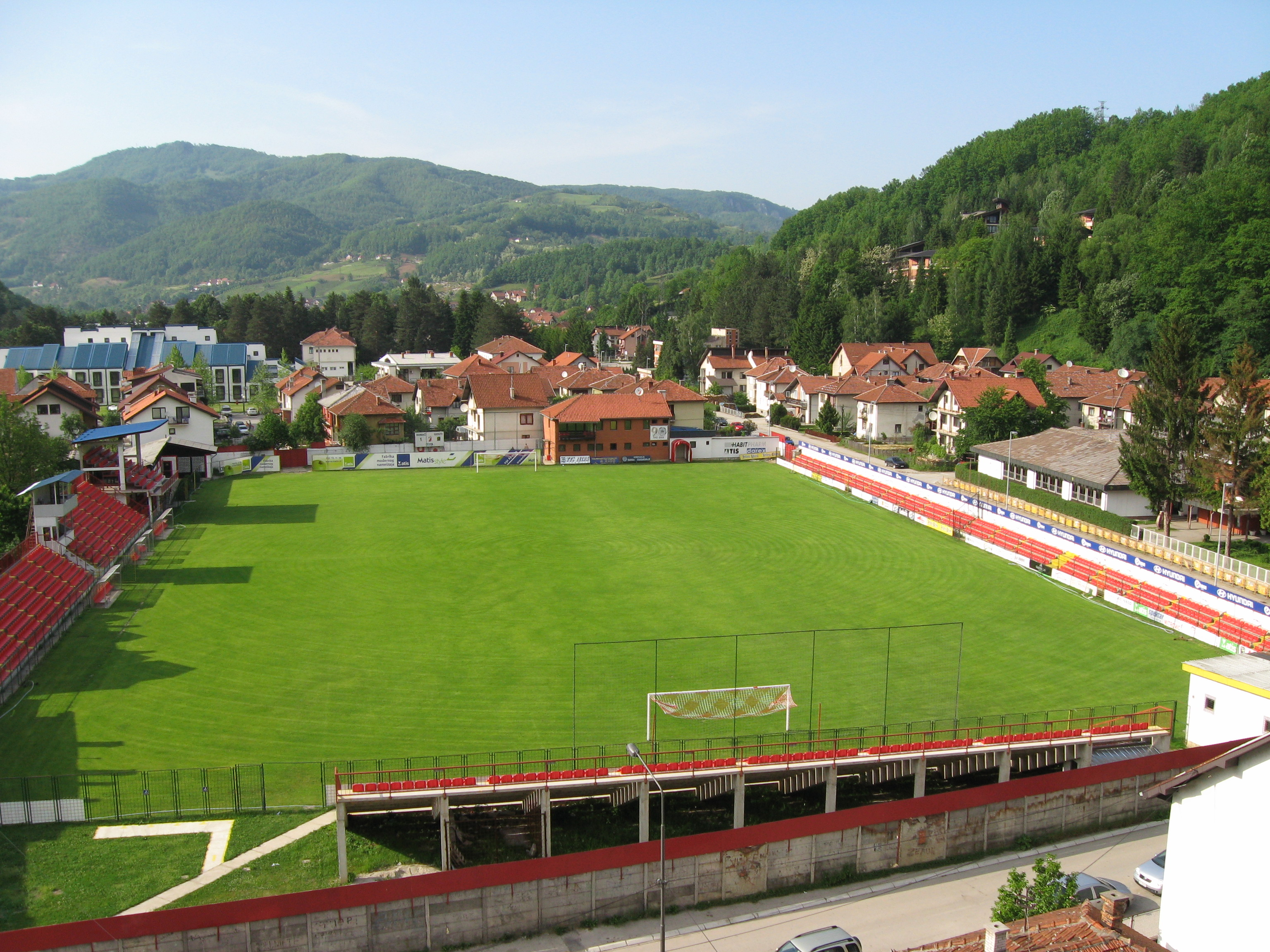
Stadium Ivanjica

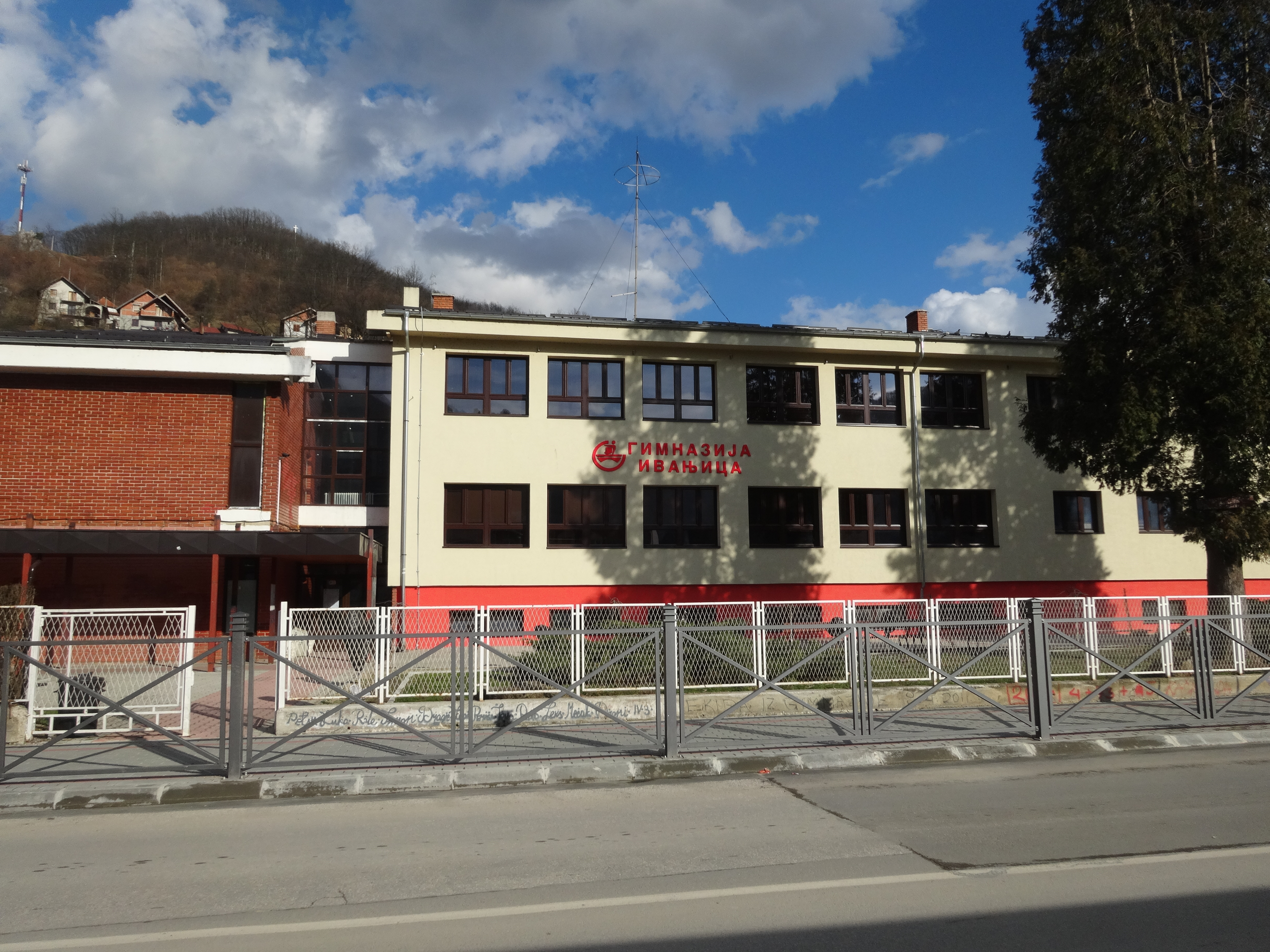
Ivanjica's Grammar School

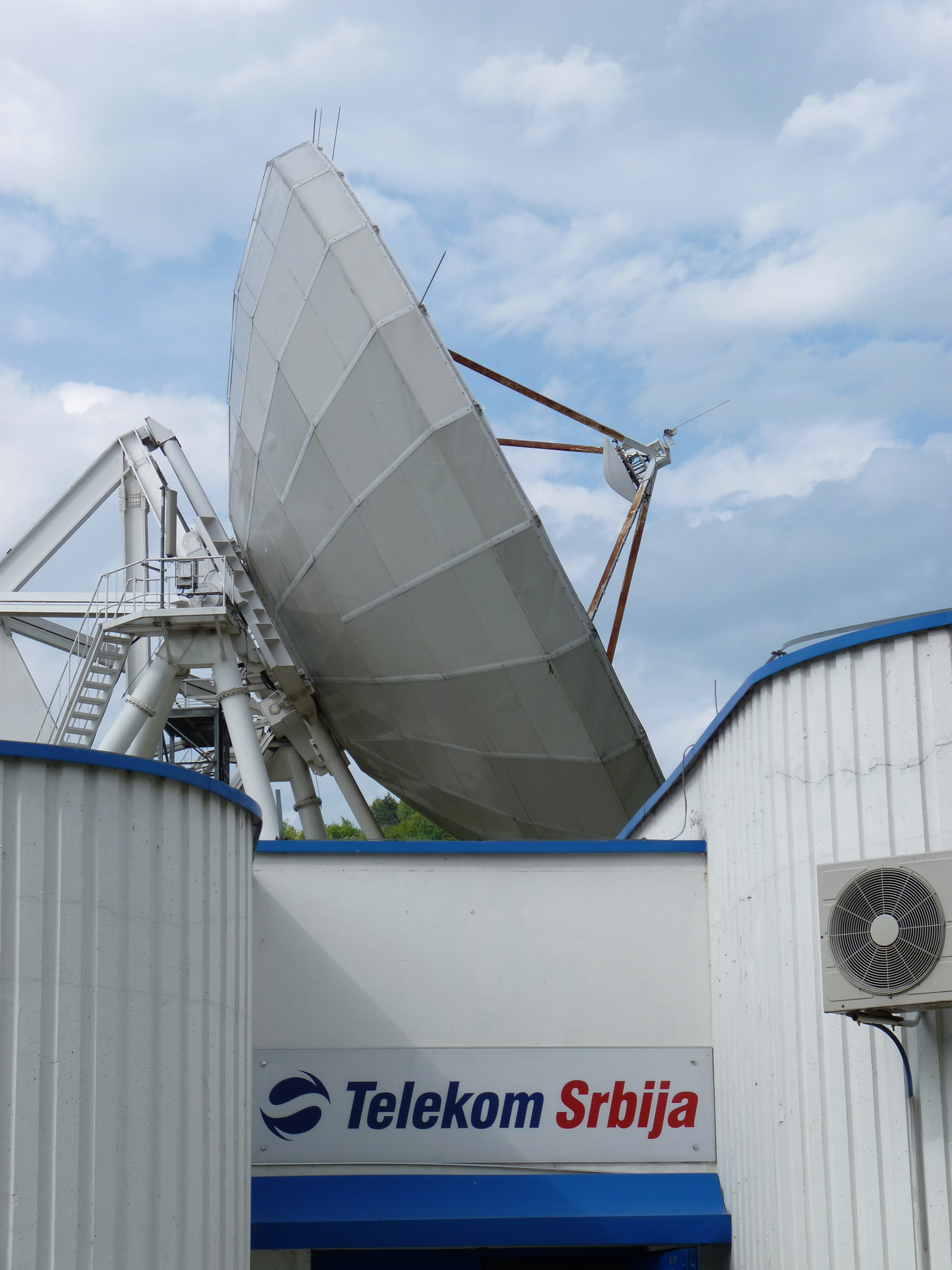
National ground station Ivanjica

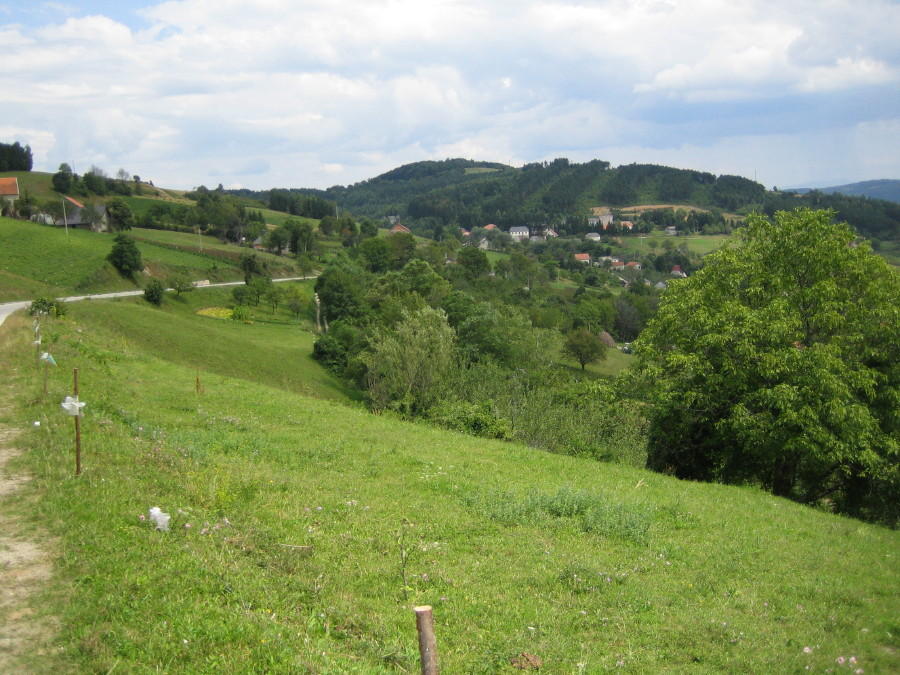
Village of Katići

== Notable residents ==
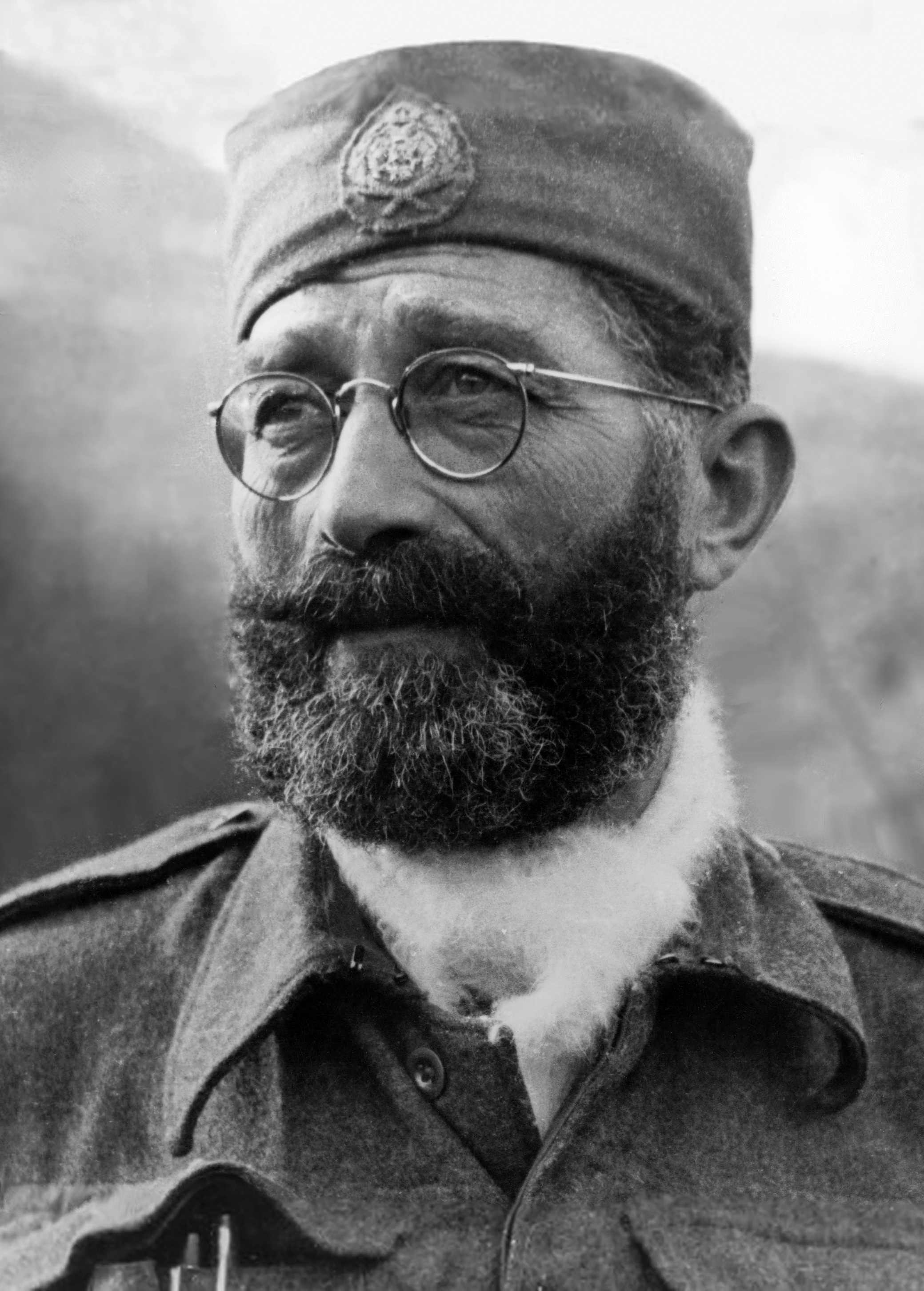
Draža Mihailović, leader of Chetniks movement, was born in Ivanjica

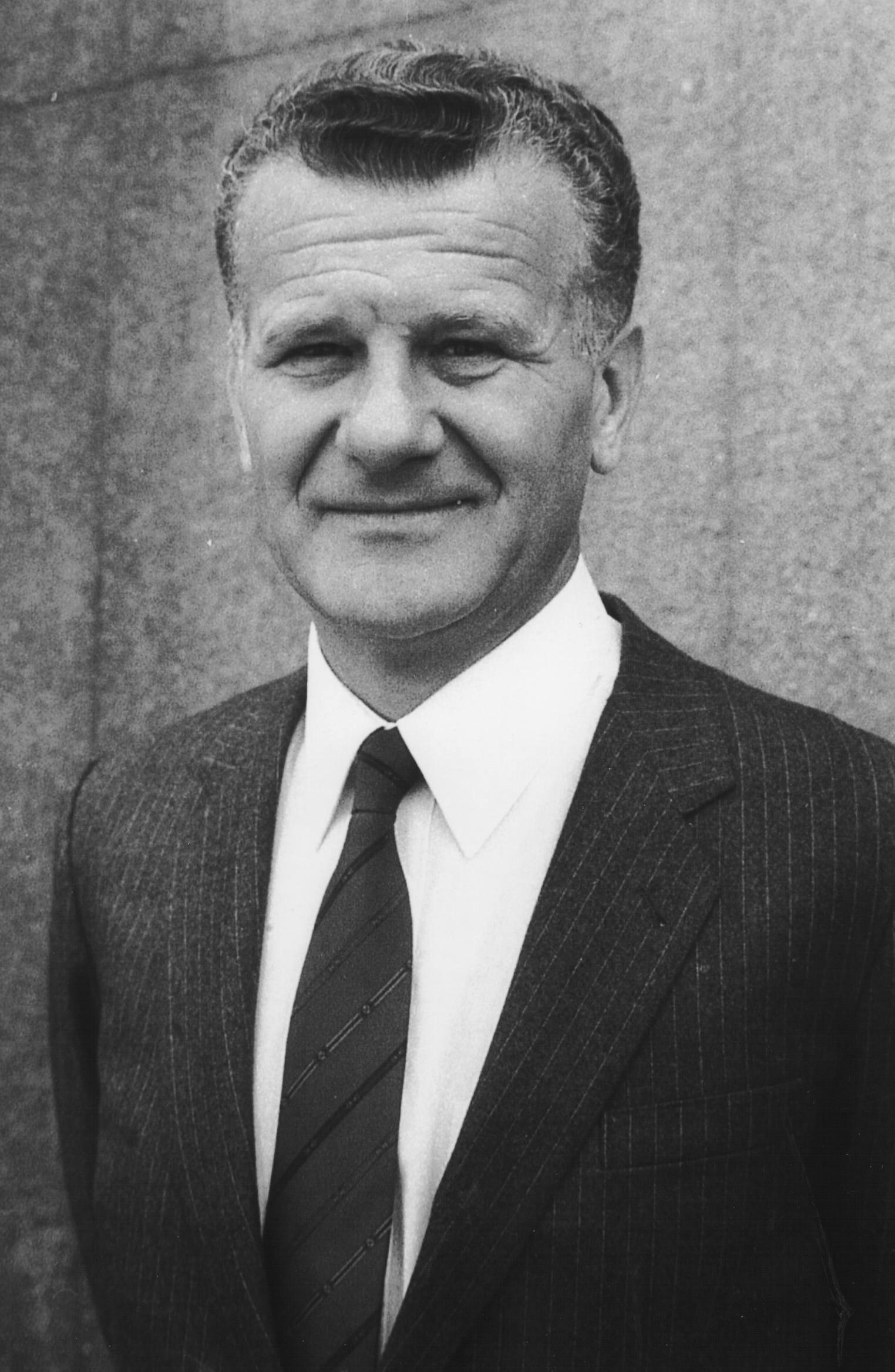
Ivan Stambolić, President of Serbia from 1986 to 1987, and Prime Minister of Serbia from 1978 to 1982

- Svetozar Botorić (1857–1916), entrepreneur
- Damjan Popović (1857–1928), general
- Ljuba Čupa (1877–1913), guerilla fighter
- Draža Mihailović (1893–1946), leader of Chetnik movement
- Saint Jakov Novi Tumanski (1894–1946), Serbian Orthodox saint and monk
- Petar Stambolić (1912–2007), politician
- Srboljub Krivokuća (1928–2002), footballer
- Tomislav Ladan (1932–2008), essayist
- Cmiljka Kalušević (1933–1989), basketball player and athlete
- Ivan Stambolić (1936–2000), politician
- Vladica Kovačević (1940–2016), footballer
- Petar Krivokuća (b. 1947), footballer
- Snežana Bogosavljević Bošković (b. 1964), politician
- Đorđe Milisavljević (b. 1969), playwright
- Radovan Ćurčić (b. 1972), football coach
- Milovan Milović (b. 1980), footballer
- Ana Subotić (b. 1983), athlete, long-distance runner

== See also ==
- List of places in Serbia

== Sources ==
- Jončić, Koča (1985). Narodni ustanak i borbe za Kraljevo 1941. godine: zbornik radova naučnog skupa. Narodna knj. ISBN 978-86-331-0001-4.
