= Vrmbaje =

- Village
- Location within Serbia
- Coordinates: 43°31′N 20°23′E
- Country: Serbia
- District: Moravica District
- Municipality: Ivanjica

Area
  - Total: 29.50 km^{2} (11.39 sq mi)

Population (2011)
  - Total: 304
  - Density: 10.3/km^{2} (26.7/sq mi)
- Time zone: UTC+1 (CET)
  - Summer (DST): UTC+2 (CEST)

Vrmbaje is a village in the municipality of Ivanjica, Serbia. According to the 2011 census, the village has a population of 304 inhabitants.
