= Kumanica =

- Village
- Location within Serbia
- Coordinates: 43°28′N 20°14′E
- Country: Serbia
- District: Moravica District
- Municipality: Ivanjica

Area
  - Total: 23.13 km^{2} (8.93 sq mi)

Population (2011)
  - Total: 192
  - Density: 8.30/km^{2} (21.5/sq mi)
- Time zone: UTC+1 (CET)
  - Summer (DST): UTC+2 (CEST)

Kumanica is a village in the municipality of Ivanjica, Serbia. According to the 2011 census, the village has a population of 192 inhabitants.
