= Medovine =

- Village
- Location within Serbia
- Coordinates: 43°21′10″N 20°09′57″E
- Country: Serbia
- District: Moravica District
- Municipality: Ivanjica

Area
  - Total: 39.30 km^{2} (15.17 sq mi)

Population (2011)
  - Total: 98
  - Density: 2.5/km^{2} (6.5/sq mi)
- Time zone: UTC+1 (CET)
  - Summer (DST): UTC+2 (CEST)

Medovine is a village in the municipality of Ivanjica, Serbia. According to the 2011 census, the village has a population of 98 inhabitants.
