= Luke (Ivanjica) =

Luke Луке
- Village
- Location within Serbia
- Coordinates: 43°36′52″N 20°17′21″E
- Country: Serbia
- District: Moravica District
- Municipality: Ivanjica

Area
  - Total: 36.74 km^{2} (14.19 sq mi)

Population (2011)
  - Total: 939
  - Density: 25.6/km^{2} (66.2/sq mi)
- Time zone: UTC+1 (CET)
  - Summer (DST): UTC+2 (CEST)

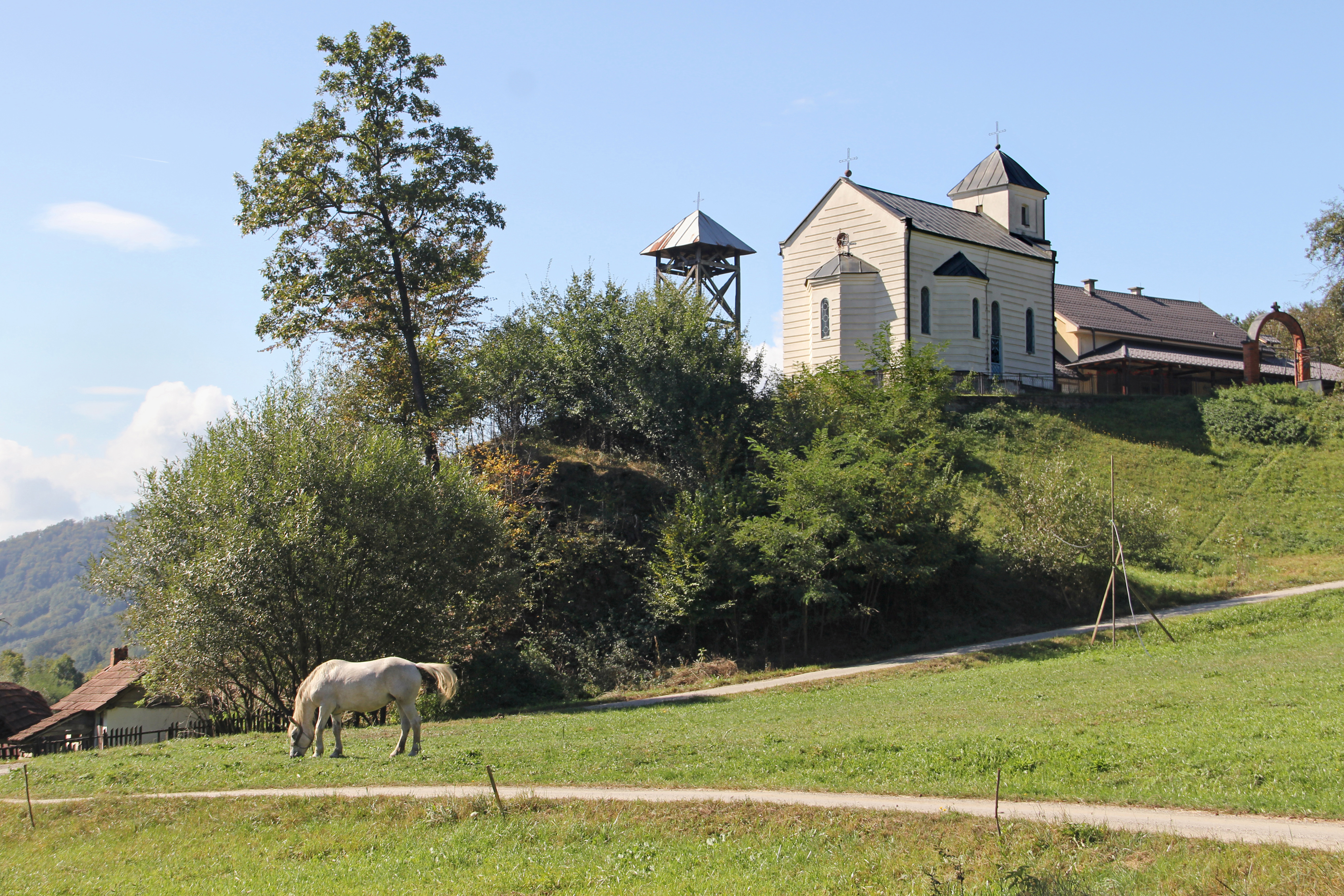
Luke village (Ivanjica Municipality), Serbia.

Luke is a village in the municipality of Ivanjica, Serbia. According to the 2011 census, the village has a population of 939 inhabitants.
