= Nebeska Suza =

Lake in Serbia

- Location within Serbia Location within Balkans
- Location: Golija mountain
- Coordinates: 43°27′15″N 20°16′52″E
- Basin countries: Serbia
- Surface elevation: 1,495 m (4,905 ft)

Nebeska Suza (Serbian Cyrillic: Небеска Суза, lit. 'Tear of Heaven') is a tiny lake at the Golija mountain in Serbia at the elevation of 1495 metres near Okruglica.

== History ==
Nebeska Suza lake was unearthed following an earthquake in bordering Romania.
