= Golijska Moravica =

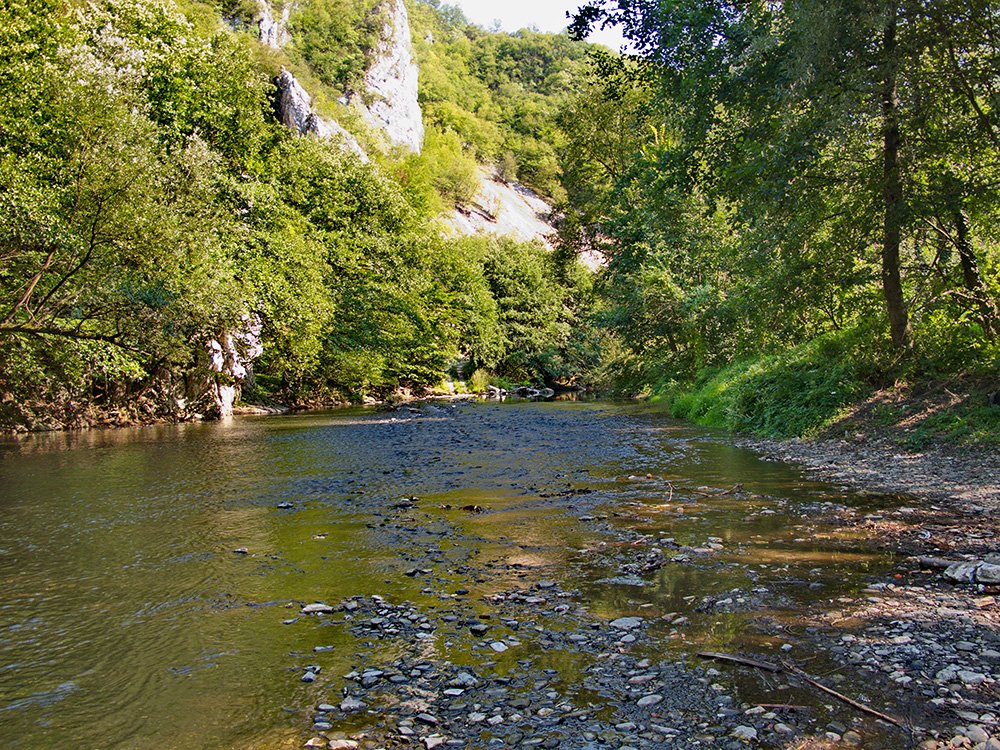
- Moravica passing near village Dobrače
- Native name: Голијска Моравица (Serbian)

Location
- Country: Serbia

Physical characteristics
- Source
  - location: Golija mountain, northeast of Sjenica, Serbia
- Mouth
  - location: with the Đetinja forms the Zapadna Morava, east of Požega, Serbia
  - coordinates: 43°50′50″N 20°04′24″E
- Length: 98 km (61 mi)
- Basin size: 1,513 km^{2} (584 sq mi)

Basin features
- Progression: West Morava→ Great Morava→ Danube→ Black Sea

The Golijska Moravica or simply Moravica (Serbian Cyrillic: Голијска Моравица or Моравица) is a river in western Serbia. With a length of 98 km, it is the longer headstream of the West Morava (the name it takes at its confluence with the Đetinja), and thus, of the Great Morava. Its name, Moravica, means "little Morava" in Serbian, and it also gives its name to the surrounding region and the modern Moravica District of Serbia.

== Stari Vlah ==
The Golijska Moravica originates from the western slopes of the Golija mountain and flows straight to the north, between the Golija and Javor mountains, through the Stari Vlah region. Even though the area in the lower course is sparsely populated, there are many hamlets on the river, characteristically organized in clusters. More important are the villages of Sakovići, Gazdovići, Kumanica, Međurečje (where it receives the Nošnica from the left) and Čitluk.

== Ivanjica depression ==
The Golijska Morava enters the Ivanjica depression, located between the mountains of Čemerno on the east, and Mučanj on the west. This is where it receives the Lučka reka from the right and Grabovička reka from the left and flows through the town of Ivanjica, its suburbs of Bedina Varoš and Šume, the satellite earth station of Prilike and the village of Dubrava. At the end of the depression, the Golijska Moravica passes next to the monastery of Sveti Arhanđeli, as it continues to the north.

== Arilje depression & Tašti field ==
From Ivanjica depression, the Golijska Moravica flows into the Arilje depression, located between the mountains of Golubac (on the east) and Blagaja (on the west), where it receives the Trešnjevica river from the right (at the village of Trešnjevica's hamlet of Divljaka), and its major tributary, the Rzav from the right, near the town of Arilje, which itself used to be called Moravica in medieval period.

South of Arilje is a micro hydro Brusnik with small reservoir. In 2020, construction of the facility caused erosion of the river bank, which after heavy rains resulted in change of Moravica's route and damage to the Požega-Ivanjica road which collapsed. In August 2022, the water and sludge from the reservoir were discharged without a warning, causing a 2 m (6 ft 7 in) tall tidal wave at Divljaka and massive fish kill.

In the final section, the Golijska Morava reaches the Tašti field, located between the mountains of Blagaja, Krstac and Crnokosa, east of the town of Požega. Near the village of Pilatovići, the Golijska Morava meets the Đetinja and together they form the West Morava, longer headwater of the Great Morava.

The Golijska Moravica drains an area of 1,513 km^{2} (584 sq mi), belongs to the Black Sea drainage area and it is not navigable. The river's potential for power production is not used.
