= Klisura Monastery (Serbia) =

Orthodox Monastery

Klisura Monastery Манастир Клисура
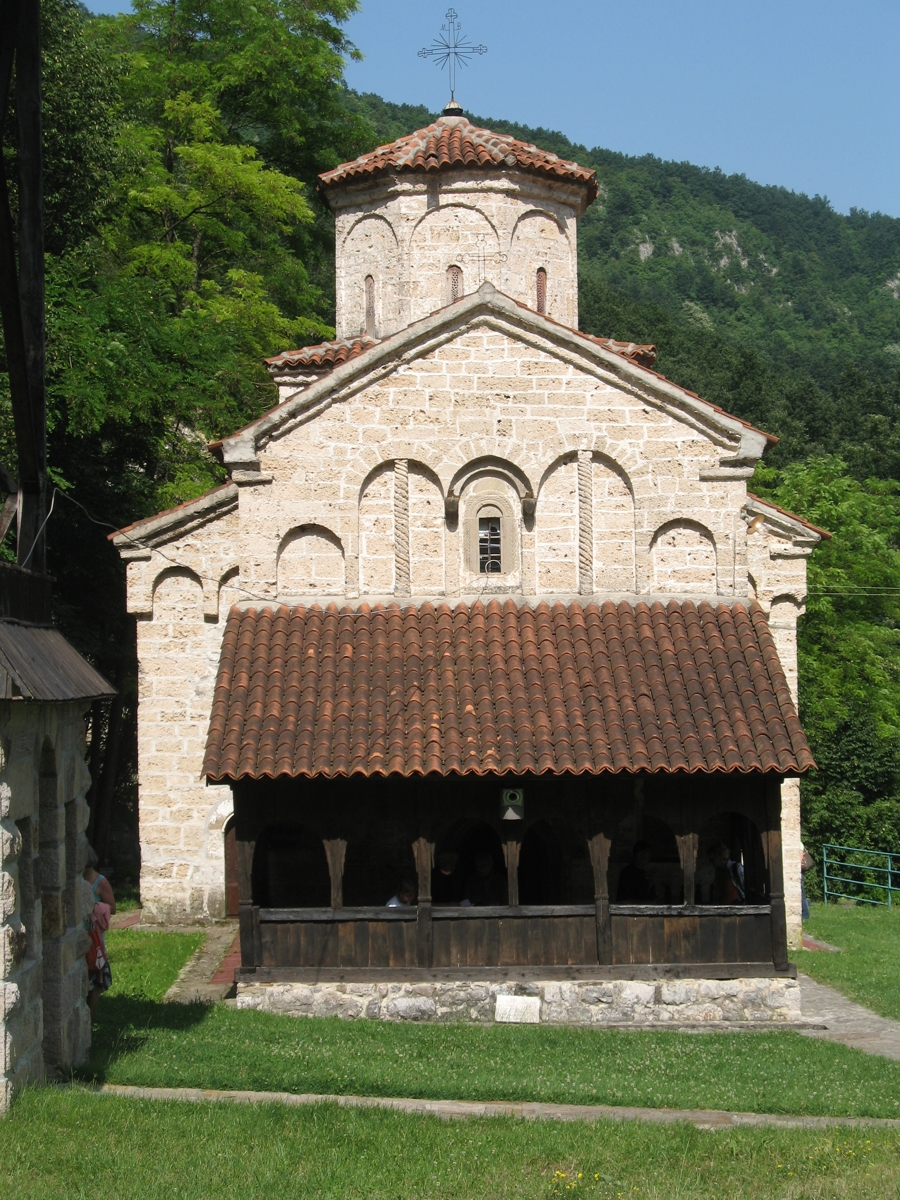
- Interactive map of Klisura Monastery; Манастир Клисура

Monastery information
- Full name: Манастир – Клисура
- Order: Serbian Orthodox
- Established: 13th century
- Dedication: Gabriel

People
- Founder: Unknown

Site
- Location: Vrbnica (Sjenica)
- Coordinates: 43.6729°N 20.1010°E
- Public access: Yes

The Klisura Monastery, or formerly known as the Dobrača Monastery, is an active women's monastery that originates from the Middle Ages and belongs to the Eparchy of Žiča of the Serbian Orthodox Church.

It is located in the village of Dobrače, 13 kilometers south of Arilje, in the Moravica gorge, after which it got its name. The monastery church, dedicated to the holy archangels Michael and Gabriel, was built at the end of the 13th century in the Raška style, based on the nearby church of St. Achille, in today's Arilje, which was then the seat of the Moravian bishopric. It represents an immovable cultural asset as a cultural monument.

== History ==
It is not known who and when the monastery was built, but based on its stylistic characteristics, i.e. belonging to the Raška style and similar to the church of St. Achille, places its origin at the end of the 13th century. According to folklore, it is one of the Nemanjić dynasty endowments.

The first suffering of the monastery is related to the year 1459, when the Serbian state definitely collapsed. During the Great Turkish War, at the end of the 17th century, the monastery church (called "Dobračka") was set on fire, probably in 1688, and after its end and the Great Migration of Serbs, the monastery was abandoned in 1690.

The monastery church was rebuilt in 1798 by the monk Jaćim Karlaga (a native of Foča) and the people. According to a record from 1858, the mentioned monk came from the Rašković family from Stari Vlah. Klisura had another collapse in 1813, but soon was recovered in 1815–1816. thanks to Miloš Obrenović. In 1826, the writer and travel writer Joakim Vujić visited the monastery. The monastery was also called (1867) "small monastery", because of its small dimensions and the same church, built of stone with one cube. In the middle of the 19th century, four surrounding villages belonged to the monastery as parish branches: Dobrača, Trešnjevica, Stupčevići and Latvica. In 1872, only Abbot Chrysantije and Hieromonk Janićije lived in the monastery.

It was called Dobrački monastery until the middle of the 18th century, and then it was called Klisura. Its name was changed after a heavy rain (cloudburst) with a torrent, which completely destroyed the monastery complex. According to the schematism of the Orthodox monasteries of the Kingdom of Serbia for 1898, the monastery is classified as one of the third order. Hieromonk Joakim Milošević lived in it at the time. During the First World War, Austro-Hungarian forces raided and destroyed the monastery on several occasions, during 1915 and 1916. In the interwar period, the monastery buildings were built under the direction of elder Domentijan Zdravković. The monastery suffered new destruction during the Second World War, when the Bulgarian occupation forces set fire to and destroyed part of the monastery complex.

After the end of the war, a new hostel was built, and since 1961 it has been functioning as a women's monastery.

== Architecture and interior ==
The monastery church has a single nave foundation with a semicircular altar apse to the east, a narthex and a wooden exonarthex in the form of a porch to the west, and an eight-sided dome rising above the nave. The model for its construction is the church of Saint Achille, and it is similar to the monastery churches in Pridvorica, Morača and Sveta Trojica on Ovčar.

The original painting in its interior was destroyed in 1688, when the church was burned down, and the frescoes that can be found in its interior today are the work of the academic painter Jaroslav Kratina and were created in 1952. He added figures from Serbian folklore to classic Christian motifs. Kratina also added personalities from Serbian epic poetry, such as the Kosovo Maiden, Majka Jugović, Vojvoda Rajko and others. The iconostasis in the church consists of 42 icons and is the work of Dimitrije Posniković, who made it in 1867. He incorporated 31 icons painted in Odessa and 11 painted by himself.
