= Dobrače =

Dobrače may refer to:

- Dobrače (Arilje), a village in municipality of Arilje in Serbia
- Dobrače (Rogatica), a village in municipality of Rogatica in Bosnia and Herzegovina
