= Pogle (disambiguation) =

Pogle is a color grading system manufactured by Pandora International

Pogle may also refer to:

- Pogle bait or snack food, a military term for snacks

== See also ==
- Pogles' Wood, an animated British children's television series
- Pogled (disambiguation)
- Pogled ispod obrva an album by Severina
