= Rzav =

Rzav (pronounced [ř̩zav̞]) may refer to:

== Places ==
- Rzav (Višegrad), a village in the municipality of Višegrad, Bosnia and Herzegovina

== Rivers ==
- Rzav (Drina), or Zlatiborski Rzav ("Zlatibor Rzav"), Veliki Rzav ("Great Rzav"), a river in western Serbia and eastern Bosnia and Hercegovina
  - Beli Rzav ("White Rzav"), a headstream of the Zlatiborski Rzav
  - Crni Rzav ("Black Rzav"), a headstream of the Rzav
- Rzav (Golijska Moravica), or Golijski Rzav ("Golija Rzav"), a river in western Serbia
  - Mali Rzav ("Little Rzav"), a headstream of the Golijski Rzav
  - Veliki Rzav (Rzav) ("Great Rzav"), a headstream of the Golijski Rzav
