= Mirosaljci =

Mirosaljci may refer to:

- Mirosaljci (Arilje), a village in Serbia
- Mirosaljci (Lazarevac), a village in Serbia
