= Veliki Rzav =

Veliki Rzav ("Great Rzav") may refer to:

- Veliki Rzav (Rzav), a river in Serbia, tributary of the Rzav
- Rzav (Drina), a river in Serbia and Bosnia and Herzegovina also known as Veliki Rzav, a tributary of the Drina
