= Rzav (Golijska Moravica) =

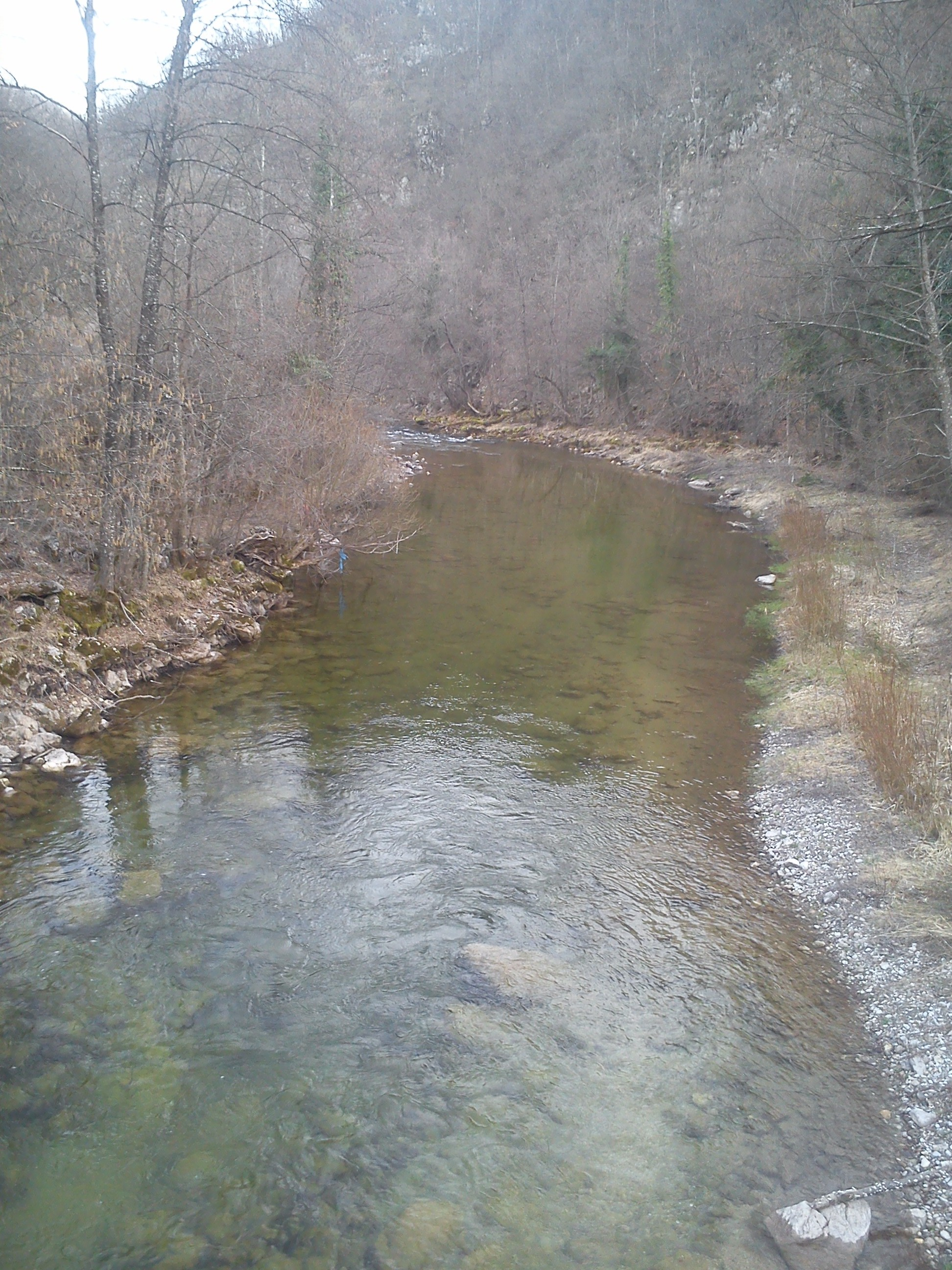
- Veliki Rzav, as seen from the simple suspension bridge in the village of Roge, February 2014
- Native name: Рзав (Serbian)

Location
- Country: Serbia

Physical characteristics
- Source
  - location: Murtenica (Zlatibor, as the Veliki Rzav) mountain
- Mouth
  - location: Golijska Moravica river, near Arilje
  - coordinates: 43.7694°N 20.1010°E
- Length: 62 km (39 mi)
- Basin size: 575 km^{2} (222 sq mi)

Basin features
- Progression: Golijska Moravica→ West Morava→ Great Morava→ Danube→ Black Sea

The Rzav (Serbian Cyrillic: Рзав) is a river in southwestern Serbia. The 62 km long left tributary to the Golijska Moravica river, it originates from two headstreams, the Veliki Rzav and the Mali Rzav. The river is sometimes referred to as the Golijski Rzav (Serbian Cyrillic: Голијски Рзав, "Rzav of Golija") to distinguish it from another Rzav river in Serbia, the Rzav of Zlatibor.

== Mali Rzav ==
The Mali Rzav (Serbian Cyrillic: Мали Рзав, "Little Rzav") is the Rzav's shorter headstream. It originates from the northern slopes of the Mučanj mountain, near the village of Katići. Originally the river flows to the west, but at the village of Bjeluša it makes a large elbow turn, parallel to the even larger elbow turn of the Veliki Rzav. At the villages of Gornja Krušćica and Vranovina, the Mali Rzav straightens its course to the north and on the southern slopes of the Blagaja mountain meets the Veliki Rzav.

== Veliki Rzav ==
The Veliki Rzav (Serbian Cyrillic: Велики Рзав, "Great Rzav") is the Rzav's longer headstream and sometimes it is referred to as just Rzav alongside its whole course. It originates from the southern slopes of the Murtenica mountain, southern extension of the Zlatibor mountain, in the northern part of the Stari Vlah region. The rivers springs out as the nameless stream at an altitude of 900 metres (3,000 ft) near the village of Močioci, in the Ivanjica municipality. It receives the waters from the Kadinjača well, Matin Potok and Jančica stream from the left, and Presečka Reka, from the right. In the base of the karst plateaus of Okruglica and Zimovnike, the stream carved impressive limestone canyon-like valley. After receiving Bela Reka at the village of Sastavci, it is officially known as Veliki Rzav.

The Veliki Rzav originally flows eastward, next to the villages of Gornja Bela Reka and Donja Bela Reka (Serbian for "upper white river" and "lower white river", referring to the river's clear water). At the village of Klekova the river sharply turns to the north, making a large elbow turn, beginning at the village of Velika, on the western slope of the Čigota mountain. Inside this elbow turn is the smaller curve of the Mali Rzav, and the two rivers get at one point less than 2 kilometres (1.2 mi) apart. In this northern section, the river carved a valley with distinct canyon-like sections: a canyon from the mouth of the Ljubišnica until Visočka Banja, Radoševski canyon and Orlovača canyon, popular among the whitewater rafters.

The Veliki Rzav receives from the left the Katušnica river and continues to curve to the north in the mountain region, between the villages of Razložina and Čičkovo, making another sharp elbow turn to the east, between the Lipovac and Gradina peaks, southeast of the town of Užice. After the village of Roge, the river continues on the southern slope of the Blagaja mountain, receiving the Mali Rzav from the right.

The spa of Visočka Banja is located on the river. The thermal water has 27 °C (81 °F). Formerly, the spa water was forming a pond of lukewarm water. The spa was recorded as health beneficial in 1936. In 1952, one of the visitors who claimed that the water helped his ailing wife, built the first, shallow spa pool. The pathways and wooden bridge were constructed in 1985. In 2012-2014 two additional, room-sized concrete pools were built, also by the former visitors. One pool has bottom filled with sand. Construction of the third, roofed pool followed, so as the paved road and new, pedestrian mountain pathway.

The water comes from the underground lake, some 30,000 thousand years old. Water is beneficial for the rheumatic and cardiac illnesses, when properly used (being still in the water and no more than three times a day with total of 20 minutes only). Just outside of the complex is another water spring ("third water", the Rzav and the spa being the first two). It allegedly helps with the eye diseases. The intake for the spring was built in 1975. Local ecologists opted not to place garbage bins, instead all visitors take garbage back with them.

=== Protection ===
The Veliki Rzav has been described as one of the cleanest European rivers, with "crystal clear" water. In 2018, survey of the section downstream from the Mučanj mountain began, in an effort to protect the surrounding valley as the special nature's reserve. The area, with the tributaries, includes water springs and wells, thermal and mineral water springs, canyons, cascades and waterfalls, and tufa ponds. Surveyed area covers 60 square kilometres (23 sq mi).

The river's course is crossed by the slopes and steep cliffs and hollows. Forests developed, predominantly deciduous, with some evergreen grows, like those of spruce. Along the river's banks grow willows and alders. They are typical for the surrounding hilly region, without major fluctuation of the underground water. Above are oak forests which in the highest sections are replaced with woods of beech.

The watershed of the river is known for diverse birds life. The gorge and ravine-like sections of the valley, and of the tributaries Bela Reka, Mala Reka, Katušnica, Prištevica and Ljubišnica, host communities of various birds, like the white-throated dipper, grey wagtail and common kingfisher. The cliffs in the area of the Močioci village are considered for possible introduction of the griffon vultures from the Uvac Special Nature Reserve. There are couple of nesting pairs of golden eagle, in the Orlovača canyon, and in the entry section of the Veliki Rzav ravine. Forested areas are inhabited by the tawny owls. Other birds in the valley include common buzzard, marsh tit, Eurasian blue tit, Eurasian nuthatch, common chiffchaff and finch.

There are 13 species of fish in the streams: rainbow trout, brown trout, European grayling, schneider, Mediterranean barbel, common nase, gudgeon, common minnow, common chub, Balkan loach, spined loach, European bullhead and stone loach. Indicator of the clean water is the presence of the stone crayfish in the streams.

=== Hydroelectricity ===
The Svračkovo Dam has been built since 2012 in the canyon at the village of the same name, 10 kilometres (6.2 mi) west of Arilje. The project was planned since the 1970s, and was originally to be finished by 1985. The reservoir will be 9 kilometres (5.6 mi) long and up to 600 metres (2,000 ft) wide, and is planned to permanently solve the problem of drinking water for the towns and municipalities of Čačak, Arilje, Požega, Lučane and Gornji Milanovac. Instead, a temporary reservoir Ševelj was formed, until the project becomes fully operational, but during the prolonged heat periods, like in 2021, it fails to provide enough drinking water. The almost total restrictions lasted from August to October 2021. The Ševelj complex was finished in 1993, and in 2021 recorded the lowest discharge ever, of only 1 cubic metre per second (35 cu ft/s), a bit above 0.7 cubic metres per second (25 cu ft/s), considered the biological minimum for the entire river. The planned lake will flood thick beech and oak forests. The environmentalists are divided on the issue, with some claiming the lake will not disturb the nature, only enhance it, while the others insists it will "permanently destroy the river, and plant and animal life in its surroundings".

A series of derivative micro hydros is planned along the entire valley of Veliki Rzav, and along its tributaries. This has been described as the largest threat to the environment in the river's watershed.

== Rzav ==
The remaining course under the name of the Rzav is less than 10 km long. It continues to the east as the natural extension of the Veliki Rzav around the Blagaja mountain, reaching the town of Arilje where it turns sharply for the last time, this time to the north, emptying into the Golijska Moravica.

For the most part, the road follows the curvy river. There are 8 beaches along the Veliki Rzav-Rzav route (Bosa Noga (Bare foot), Sonjine Oči (Sonja's eyes), Pogledi (Gazes), Urjak, Žuta Stena (Yellow rock) etc.), but the river is known for its cold water. At the locality of Bojovića Kuk, the river carved a canyon. The fishing in the river is forbidden. There are several fishponds along the route, mostly for breeding trout. At the Sonjine Čari narrowing there is a canal for rafts and small boats, but it is passable only during the high water level. The Ševelj Dam is located downstream from the Žuta Stena beach.

The Rzav drains an area of 575 square kilometres (222 sq mi), belongs to the Black Sea drainage area and it is not navigable.

== Sources ==
- Mala Prosvetina Enciklopedija, Third edition (1985); Prosveta; ISBN 86-07-00001-2
- Jovan Đ. Marković (1990): Enciklopedijski geografski leksikon Jugoslavije; Svjetlost-Sarajevo; ISBN 86-01-02651-6
