= Klisura Monastery =

Klisura Monastery or Klisurski manastir (Клисурски манастир) may refer to the following monasteries:

- Klisurski Monastery in Bulgaria, Orthodox monastery founded in 1869
- Klisura Monastery (Serbia), Orthodox monastery founded in early 13th century
