= Brekovo =

Village in northwestern Serbia

Coordinates: 43°38′53″N 20°03′40″E

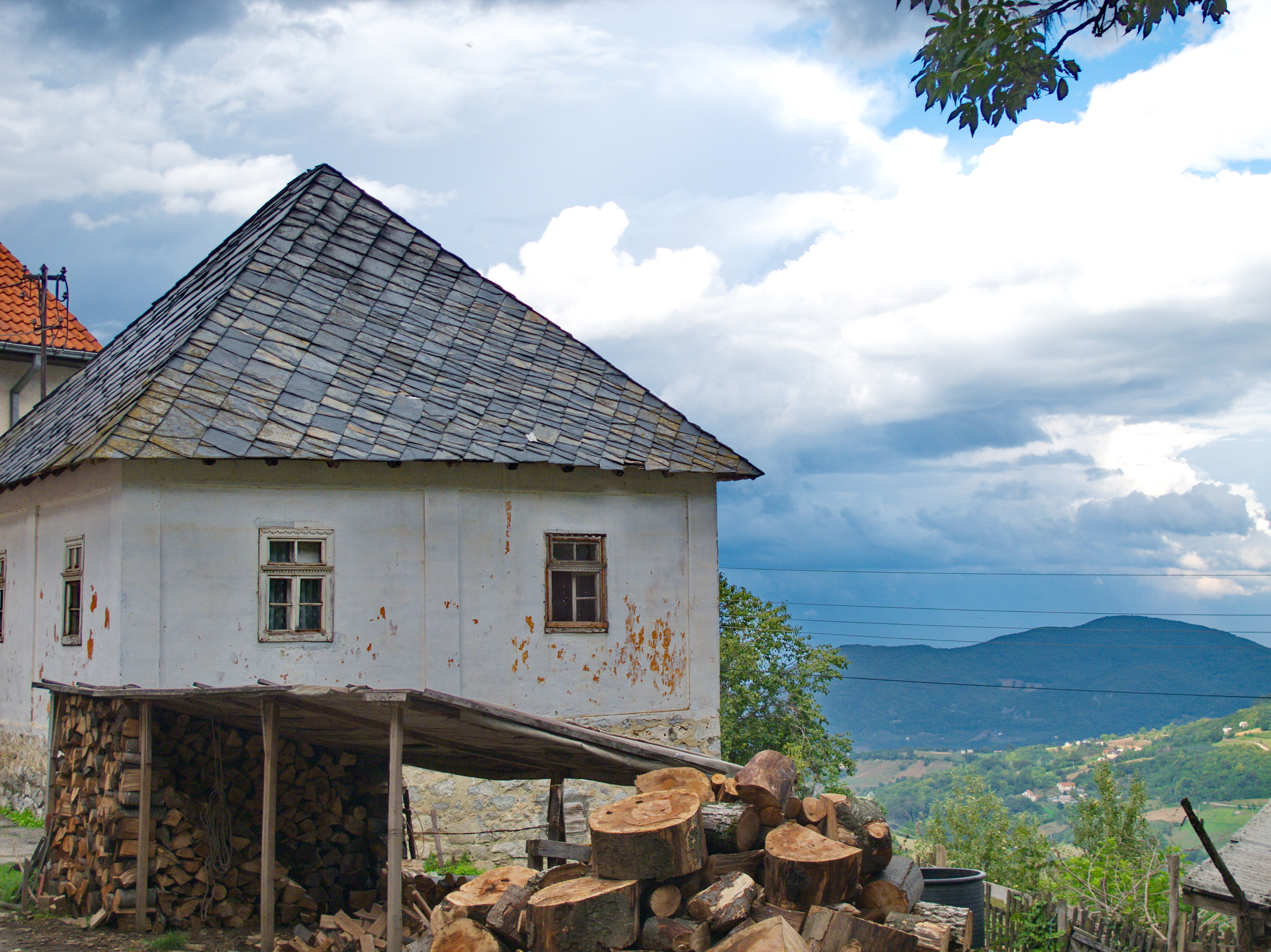
House in Brekovo.

Brekovo (Cyrillic: Брекοво) is a village in northwestern part of Serbia. It is part of the municipality of Arilje and of the Zlatibor District. Brekovo has 504 inhabitants (2011 census). River Panjica flows through the village.
