= Vigošte =

- Village
- Location within Serbia
- Coordinates: 43°44′N 20°06′E
- Country: Serbia
- District: Šumadija
- Municipality: Arilje

Area
  - Total: 6.58 km^{2} (2.54 sq mi)
- Elevation: 353 m (1,158 ft)

Population (2011)
  - Total: 1,180
  - Density: 179/km^{2} (464/sq mi)
- Time zone: UTC+1 (CET)
  - Summer (DST): UTC+2 (CEST)

Vineyard in Vigoste

Vigošte is a village in the municipality of Arilje, Serbia. According to the 2011 census, the village has a population of 1,180 people.
