= Vrane =

- Village
- Location within Serbia
- Coordinates: 43°45′N 19°55′E
- Country: Serbia
- District: Šumadija
- Municipality: Arilje

Area
  - Total: 7.71 km^{2} (2.98 sq mi)
- Elevation: 512 m (1,680 ft)

Population (2011)
  - Total: 738
  - Density: 95.7/km^{2} (248/sq mi)
- Time zone: UTC+1 (CET)
  - Summer (DST): UTC+2 (CEST)

Vrane is a village in the municipality of Arilje, Serbia. According to the 2011 census, the village has a population of 738 people.
