= Grdovići (Arilje) =

- Village
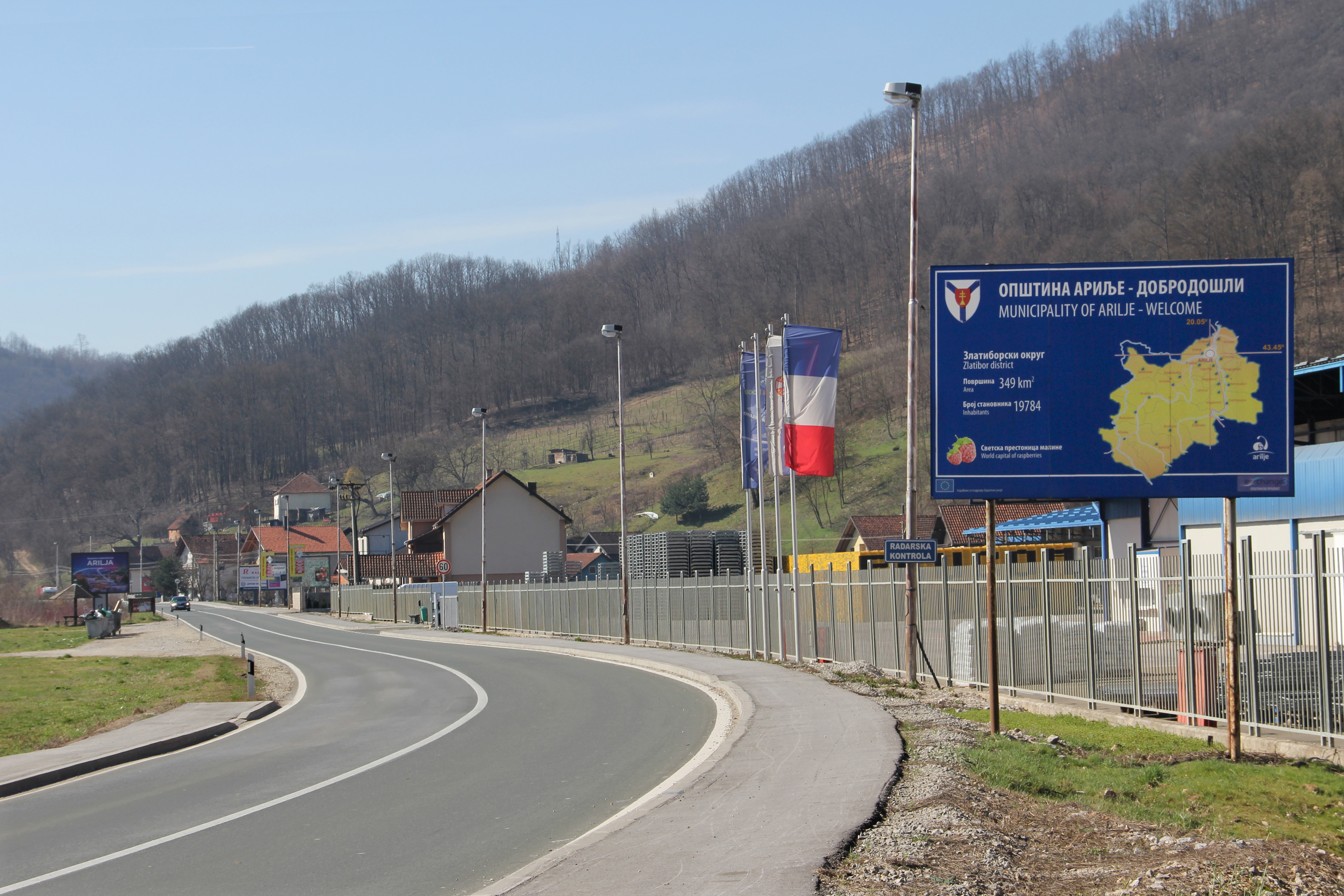
- Grdovici

- Location within Serbia
- Coordinates: 43°46′N 20°05′E
- Country: Serbia
- District: Šumadija
- Municipality: Arilje

Area
  - Total: 3.30 km^{2} (1.27 sq mi)
- Elevation: 339 m (1,112 ft)

Population (2011)
  - Total: 519
  - Density: 157/km^{2} (407/sq mi)
- Time zone: UTC+1 (CET)
  - Summer (DST): UTC+2 (CEST)

Grdovići is a village in the municipality of Arilje, Serbia. According to the 2011 census, the village has a population of 519 people.
