= Radoševo =

- Village
- Location within Serbia
- Coordinates: 43°40′N 19°56′E
- Country: Serbia
- District: Šumadija
- Municipality: Arilje

Area
  - Total: 16.84 km^{2} (6.50 sq mi)
- Elevation: 739 m (2,425 ft)

Population (2011)
  - Total: 286
  - Density: 17.0/km^{2} (44.0/sq mi)
- Time zone: UTC+1 (CET)
  - Summer (DST): UTC+2 (CEST)

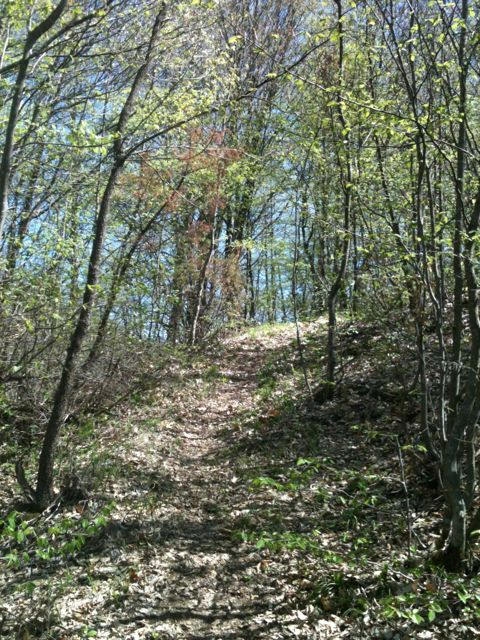
Šuma u blizini plaže Sokolica, Radoševo

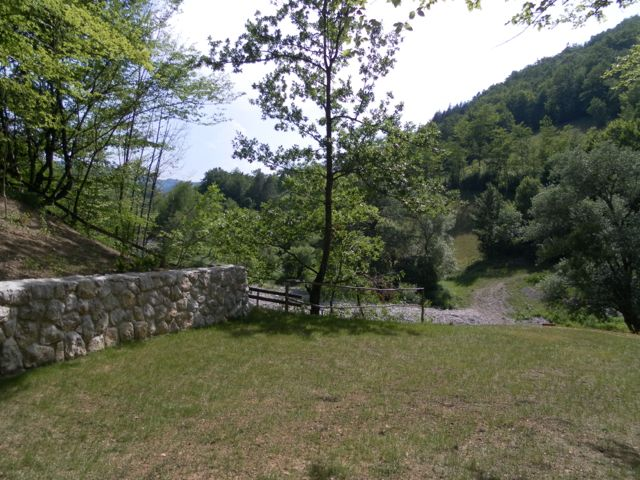
Plaža Sokolica na Rzavu, Radoševo, u blizini Arilja i Sirogojna

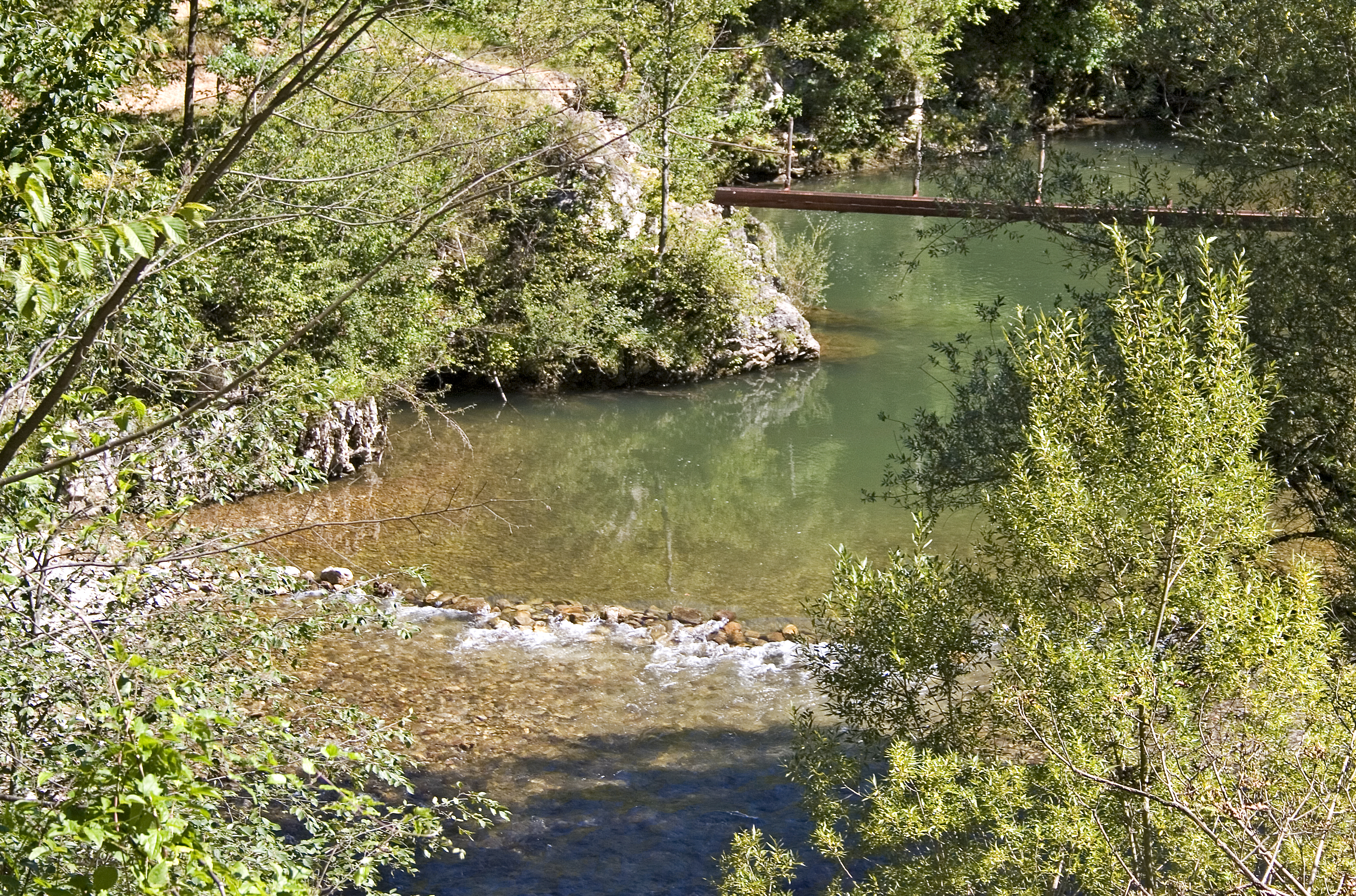
Plaža Sokolica na Rzavu, Radoševo, u blizini Arilja i Sirogojna photo: Tanja Draškić-Savić

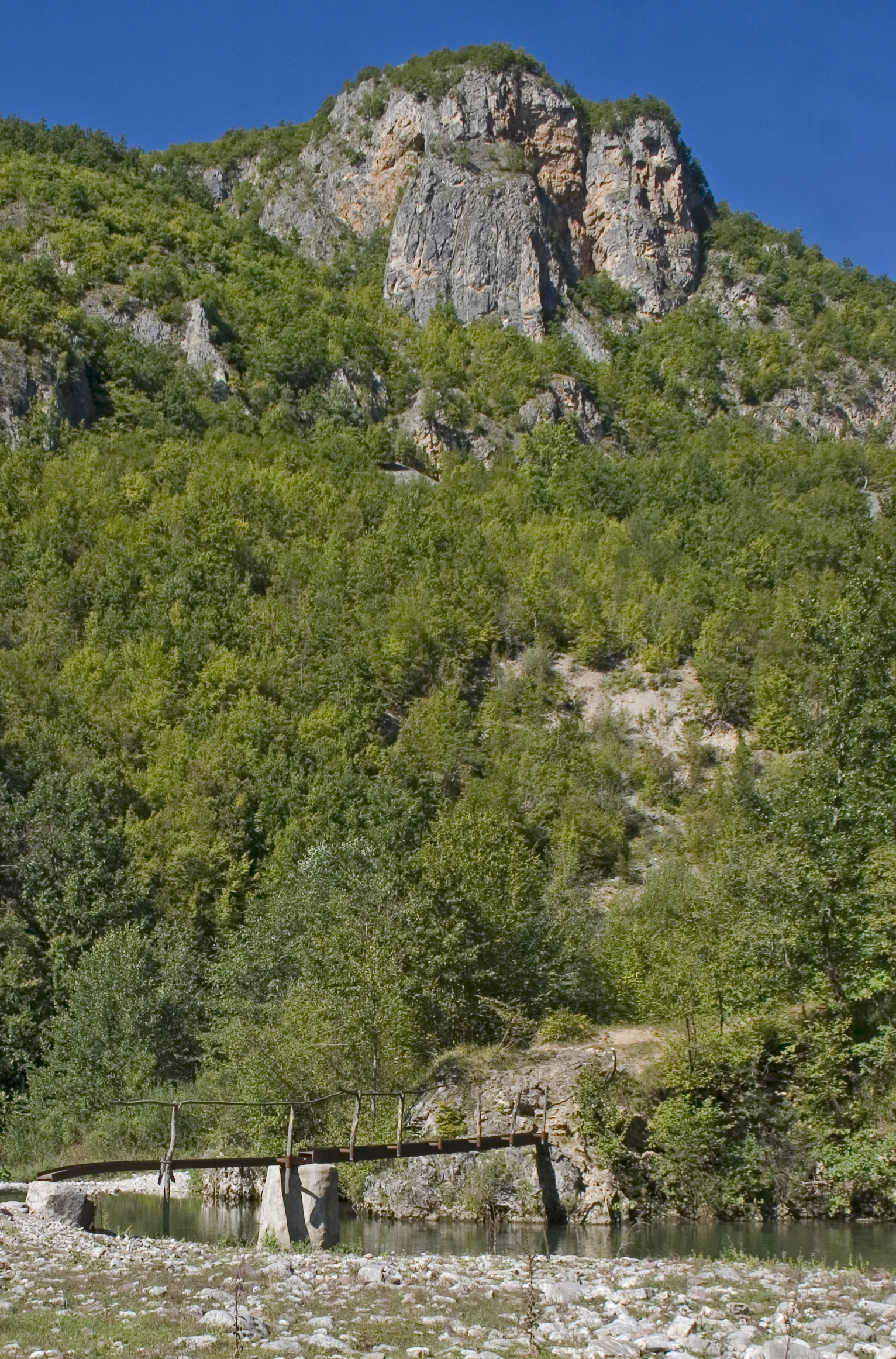
Plaža Sokolica na Rzavu, Radoševo, u blizini Arilja i Sirogojna photo: Tanja Draškić-Savić

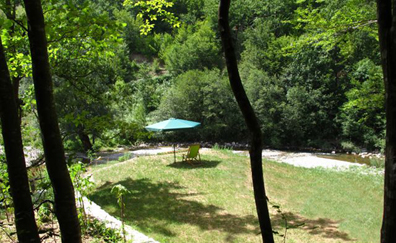
Plaža Sokolica na Rzavu, Radoševo, u blizini Arilja i Sirogojna

Radoševo is a village in the municipality of Arilje, Serbia. According to the 2011 census, the village has a population of 286 people.
