= Cerova (Arilje) =

- Village
- Location within Serbia
- Coordinates: 43°45′N 20°06′E
- Country: Serbia
- District: Šumadija
- Municipality: Arilje

Area
  - Total: 7.57 km^{2} (2.92 sq mi)
- Elevation: 451 m (1,480 ft)

Population (2011)
  - Total: 1,175
  - Density: 155/km^{2} (402/sq mi)
- Time zone: UTC+1 (CET)
  - Summer (DST): UTC+2 (CEST)

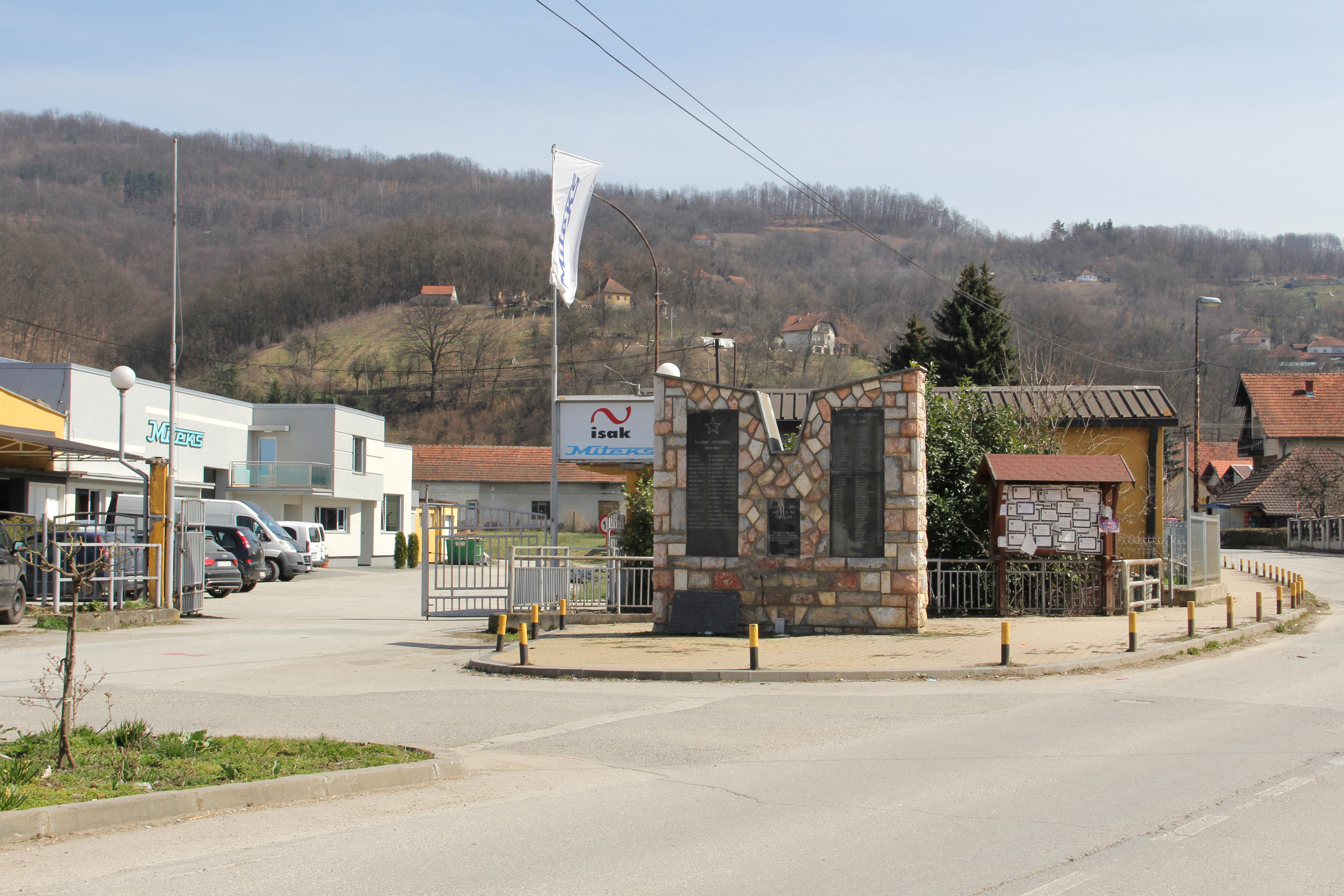
Detail from the village of Cerova

Cerova is a village in the municipality of Arilje, Serbia. According to the 2011 census, the village has a population of 1,175 people.
