= Kruščica (Arilje) =

- Village
- Location within Serbia
- Coordinates: 43°43′N 19°58′E
- Country: Serbia
- District: Šumadija
- Municipality: Arilje

Area
  - Total: 25.19 km^{2} (9.73 sq mi)
- Elevation: 749 m (2,457 ft)

Population (2011)
  - Total: 360
  - Density: 14/km^{2} (37/sq mi)
- Time zone: UTC+1 (CET)
  - Summer (DST): UTC+2 (CEST)

Kruščica is a village in the municipality of Arilje, Serbia. According to the 2011 census, the village has a population of 360 people.
