= Grivska =

- Village
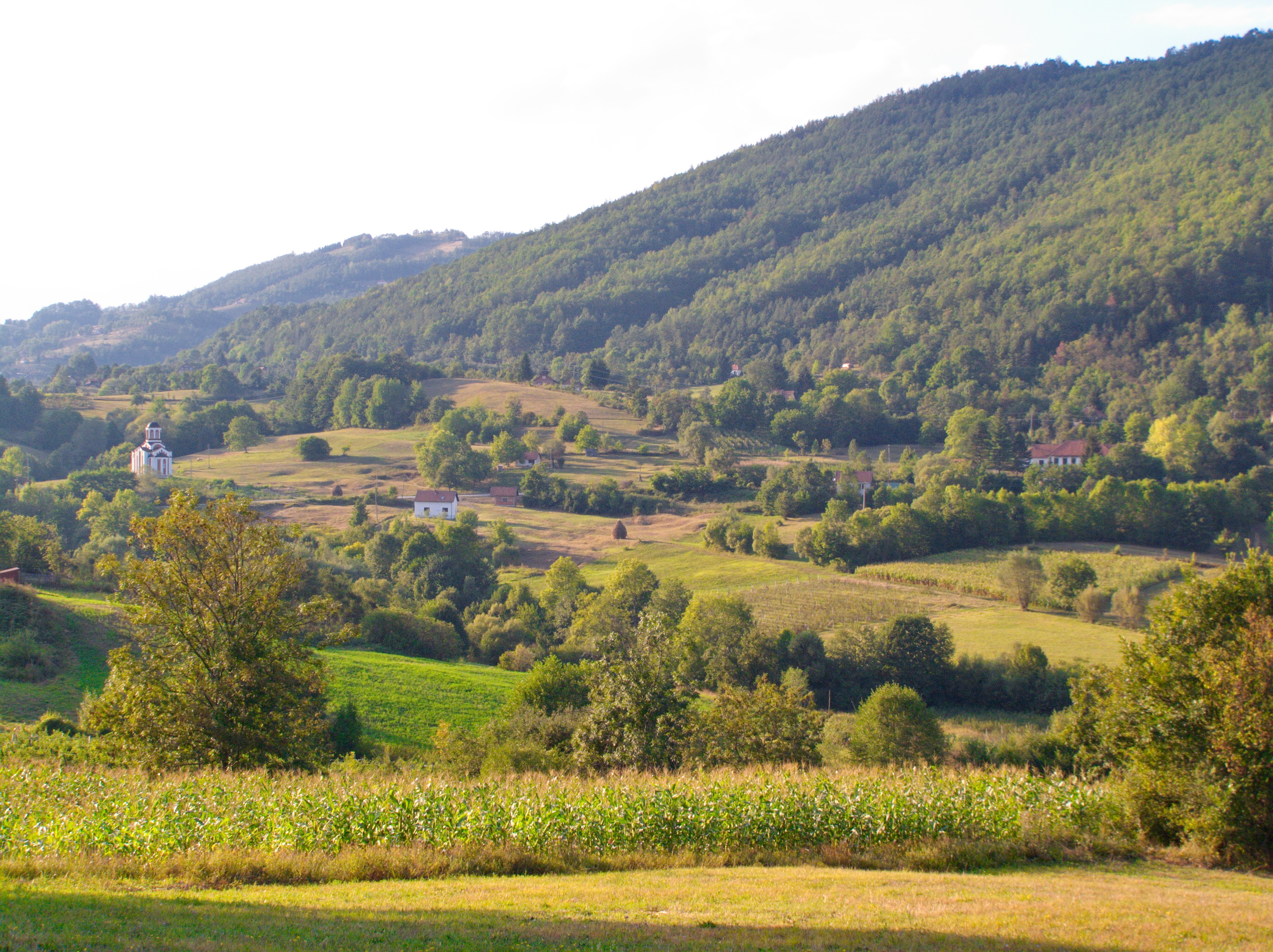

- Location within Serbia
- Coordinates: 43°42′N 20°00′E
- Country: Serbia
- District: Zlatibor
- Municipality: Arilje

Area
  - Total: 16.67 km^{2} (6.44 sq mi)
- Elevation: 649 m (2,129 ft)

Population (2011)
  - Total: 293
  - Density: 17.6/km^{2} (45.5/sq mi)
- Time zone: UTC+1 (CET)
  - Summer (DST): UTC+2 (CEST)

Grivska is a village in the municipality of Arilje, Serbia. According to the 2011 census, the village has a population of 293 people.
