= Visoka (Arilje) =

- Village
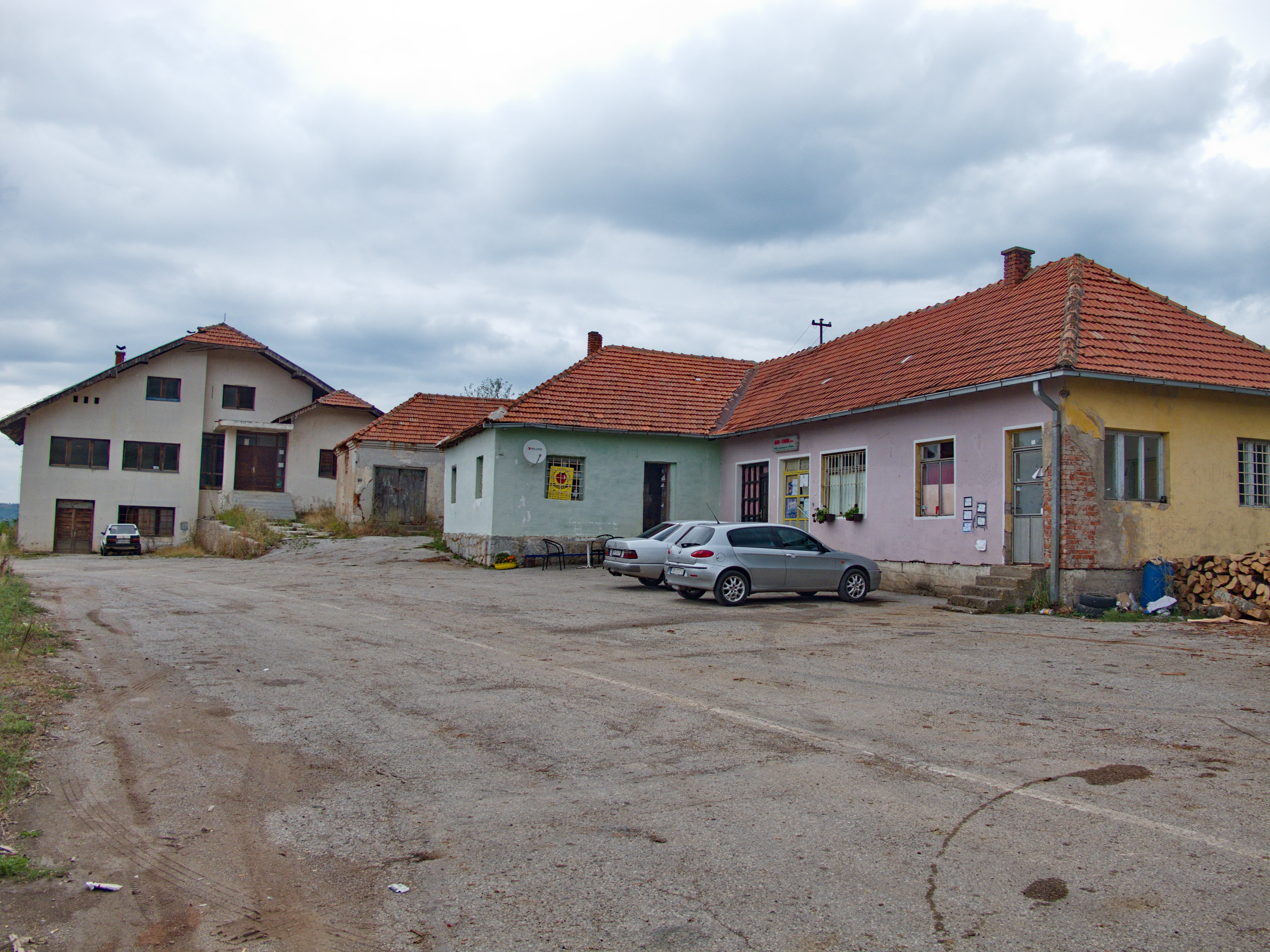

- Location within Serbia
- Coordinates: 43°37′N 19°56′E
- Country: Serbia
- District: Zlatibor
- Municipality: Arilje

Area
  - Total: 34.32 km^{2} (13.25 sq mi)
- Elevation: 943 m (3,094 ft)

Population (2011)
  - Total: 357
  - Density: 10.4/km^{2} (26.9/sq mi)
- Time zone: UTC+1 (CET)
  - Summer (DST): UTC+2 (CEST)

Visoka is a village in the municipality of Arilje, Serbia. According to the 2011 census, the village has a population of 357 people.
