= Severovo =

- Village
- Location within Serbia
- Coordinates: 43°44′N 19°57′E
- Country: Serbia
- District: Šumadija
- Municipality: Arilje

Area
  - Total: 16.07 km^{2} (6.20 sq mi)
- Elevation: 822 m (2,697 ft)

Population (2011)
  - Total: 226
  - Density: 14.1/km^{2} (36.4/sq mi)
- Time zone: UTC+1 (CET)
  - Summer (DST): UTC+2 (CEST)

Severovo is a village in the municipality of Arilje, Serbia. According to the 2011 census, the village has a population of 226 people.
