= Bogojevići =

Village in the municipality of Arilje, Serbia

- Village
- Location within Serbia
- Coordinates: 43°43′N 20°05′E
- Country: Serbia
- District: Šumadija
- Municipality: Arilje

Area
  - Total: 7.76 km^{2} (3.00 sq mi)
- Elevation: 388 m (1,273 ft)

Population (2011)
  - Total: 634
  - Density: 81.7/km^{2} (212/sq mi)
- Time zone: UTC+1 (CET)
  - Summer (DST): UTC+2 (CEST)

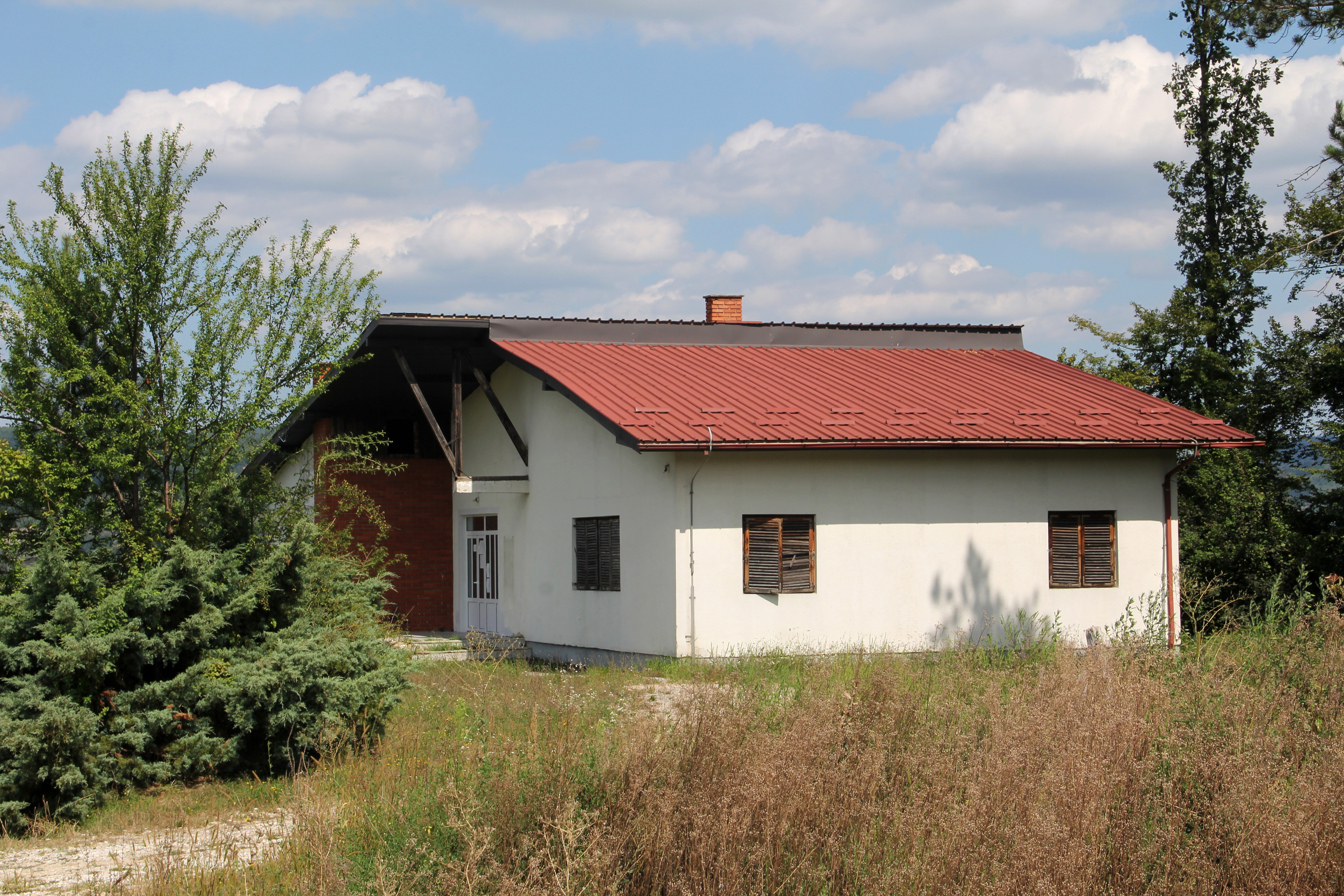
Bogojevici village, Arilje, Serbia.

Bogojevići (Serbian Cyrillic: Богојевићи) is a village in the municipality of Arilje, Serbia. According to the 2011 census, the village has a population of 634 people.
