= Pogled =

Pogled may refer to:

In Montenegro:

- Pogled (mountain peak), a mountain peak in Kosovo, Serbia, and Montenegro

In Serbia:

- Pogled, Arilje, a settlement in the Municipality of Arilje

In Slovenia:

- Pogled, Moravče, a settlement in the Municipality of Moravče
- Pogled, Apače, a settlement in the Municipality of Apače
