= Virovo (Arilje) =

- Village
- Location within Serbia
- Coordinates: 43°46′N 20°07′E
- Country: Serbia
- District: Šumadija
- Municipality: Arilje

Area
  - Total: 10.16 km^{2} (3.92 sq mi)
- Elevation: 418 m (1,371 ft)

Population (2011)
  - Total: 550
  - Density: 54/km^{2} (140/sq mi)
- Time zone: UTC+1 (CET)
  - Summer (DST): UTC+2 (CEST)

Virovo is a village in the municipality of Arilje, Serbia. According to the 2011 census, the village has a population of 550 people.
