= Radobuđa =

- Village
- Location within Serbia
- Coordinates: 43°44′N 20°02′E
- Country: Serbia
- District: Šumadija
- Municipality: Arilje

Area
  - Total: 15.39 km^{2} (5.94 sq mi)
- Elevation: 477 m (1,565 ft)

Population (2011)
  - Total: 307
  - Density: 19.9/km^{2} (51.7/sq mi)
- Time zone: UTC+1 (CET)
  - Summer (DST): UTC+2 (CEST)

Radobuđa is a village in the municipality of Arilje, Serbia. According to the 2011 census, the village has a population of 307 people.
