= Dragojevac (Arilje) =

Dragojevac Драгојевац
- Village
- Location within Serbia
- Coordinates: 43°43′N 20°07′E
- Country: Serbia
- District: Šumadija
- Municipality: Arilje

Area
  - Total: 6.54 km^{2} (2.53 sq mi)
- Elevation: 404 m (1,325 ft)

Population (2011)
  - Total: 264
  - Density: 40.4/km^{2} (105/sq mi)
- Time zone: UTC+1 (CET)
  - Summer (DST): UTC+2 (CEST)

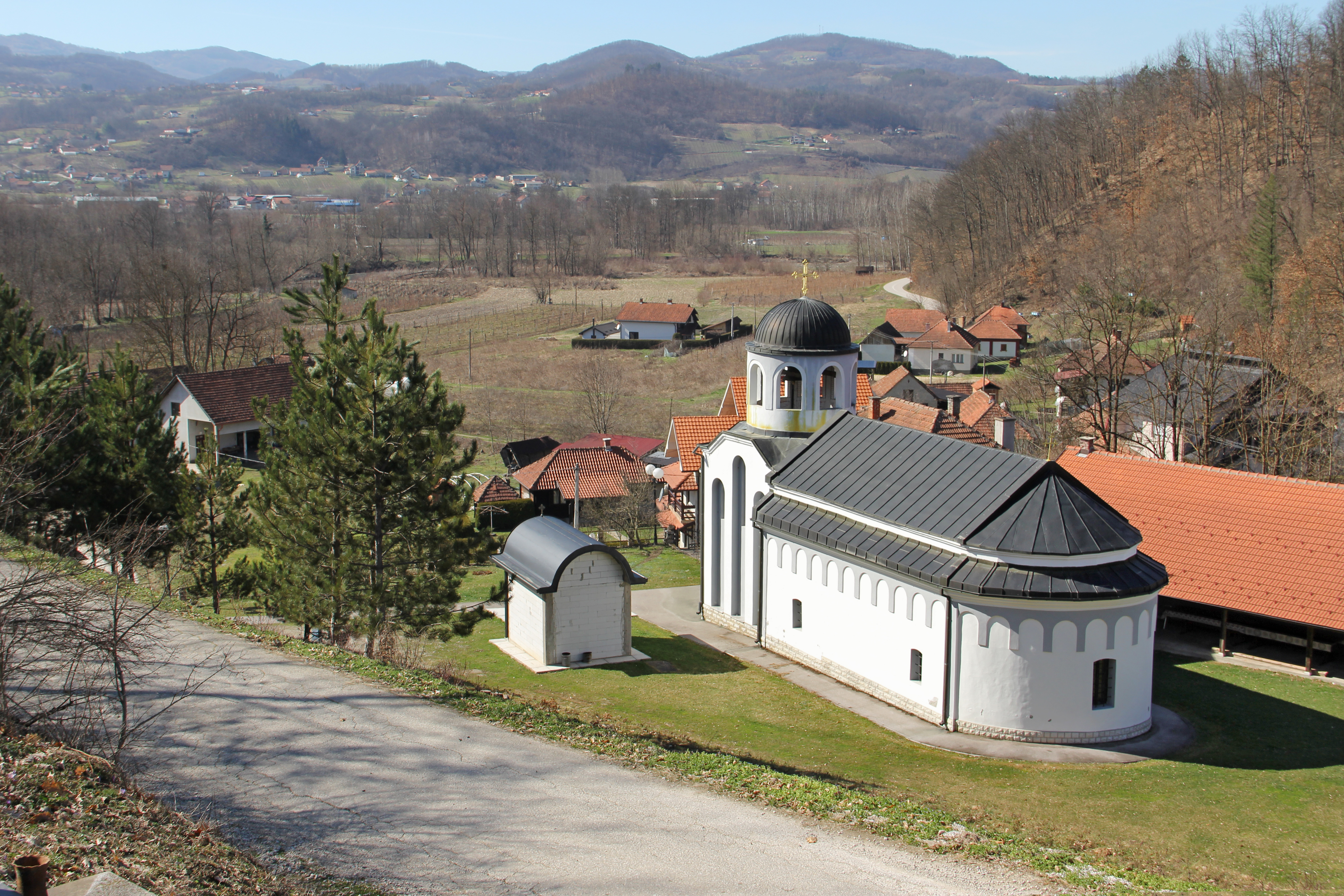
Village of Dragojevac (former Trbuhovac), (Municipality of Arilje), Serbia.

Dragojevac (Serbian Cyrillic: Драгојевац) is a village in the municipality of Arilje, Serbia. According to the 2011 census, the village has a population of 264 people.
