= Mirosaljci (Arilje) =

- Village
- Location within Serbia
- Coordinates: 43°42′N 20°07′E
- Country: Serbia
- District: Šumadija
- Municipality: Arilje

Area
  - Total: 20.16 km^{2} (7.78 sq mi)
- Elevation: 422 m (1,385 ft)

Population (2011)
  - Total: 792
  - Density: 39.3/km^{2} (102/sq mi)
- Time zone: UTC+1 (CET)
  - Summer (DST): UTC+2 (CEST)

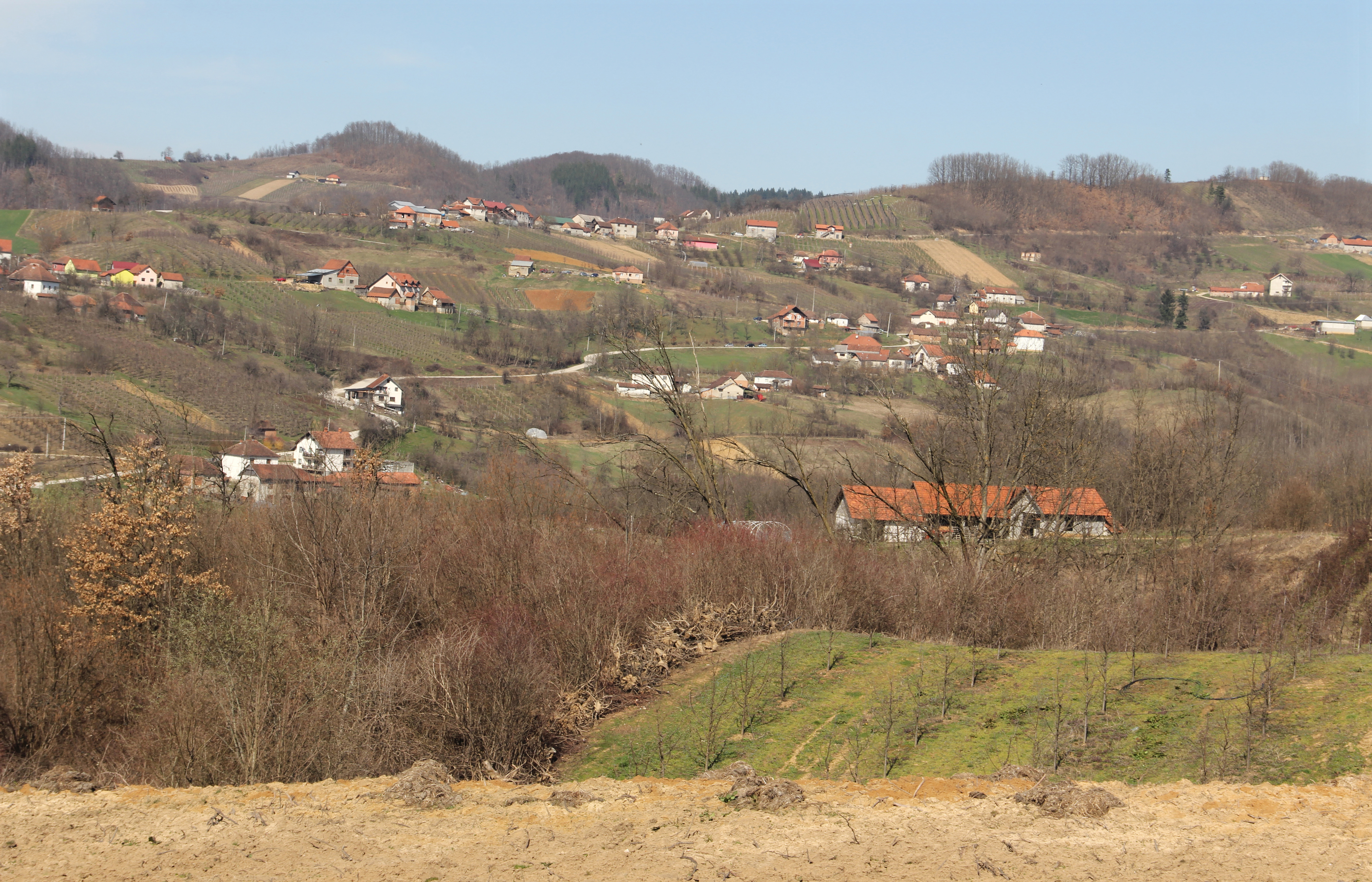
Village of Mirosaljci (Municipality of Arilje), Serbia.

Mirosaljci is a village in the municipality of Arilje, Serbia. According to the 2011 census, the village has a population of 792 people.
