= Stupčevići =

- Village
- Location within Serbia
- Coordinates: 43°42′N 20°06′E
- Country: Serbia
- District: Šumadija
- Municipality: Arilje

Area
  - Total: 13.20 km^{2} (5.10 sq mi)
- Elevation: 392 m (1,286 ft)

Population (2011)
  - Total: 968
  - Density: 73.3/km^{2} (190/sq mi)
- Time zone: UTC+1 (CET)
  - Summer (DST): UTC+2 (CEST)

Stupčevići is a village in the municipality of Arilje, Serbia. According to the 2011 census, the village has a population of 968 people.
