= Klekova =

- Village
- Location within Serbia
- Coordinates: 43°34′06″N 19°57′35″E
- Country: Serbia
- District: Moravica District
- Municipality: Ivanjica

Area
  - Total: 10.17 km^{2} (3.93 sq mi)

Population (2011)
  - Total: 89
  - Density: 8.8/km^{2} (23/sq mi)
- Time zone: UTC+1 (CET)
  - Summer (DST): UTC+2 (CEST)

Klekova is a village in the municipality of Ivanjica, Serbia. According to the 2011 census, the village has a population of 89 inhabitants.
