= Latvica =

- Village
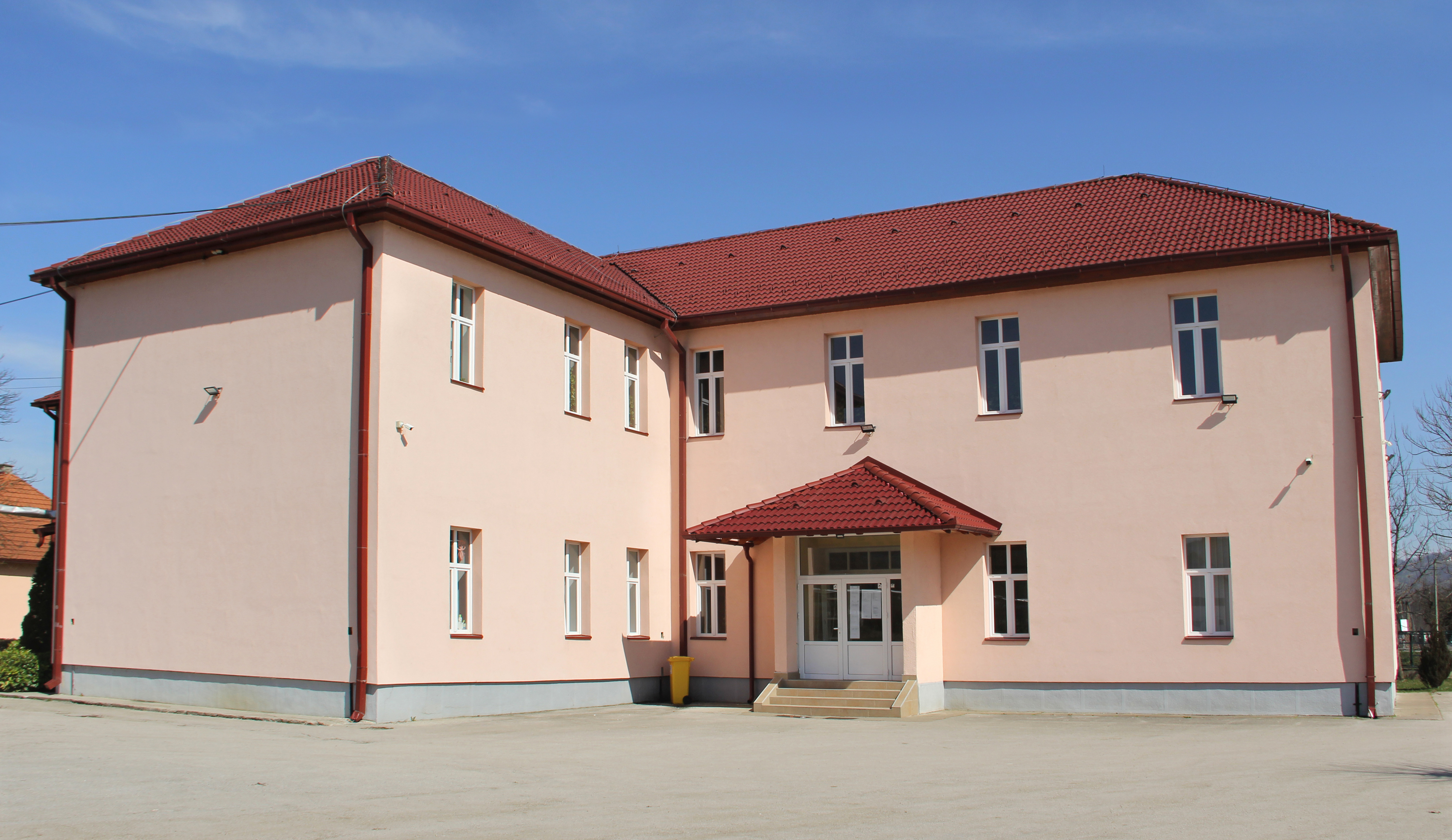
- Latvian building

- Location within Serbia
- Coordinates: 43°42′N 20°05′E
- Country: Serbia
- District: Šumadija
- Municipality: Arilje

Area
  - Total: 9.69 km^{2} (3.74 sq mi)
- Elevation: 480 m (1,570 ft)

Population (2011)
  - Total: 293
  - Density: 30.2/km^{2} (78.3/sq mi)
- Time zone: UTC+1 (CET)
  - Summer (DST): UTC+2 (CEST)

Latvica is a village in the municipality of Arilje, Serbia. According to the 2011 census, the village has a population of 293 people.
