= Šume (Ivanjica) =

Šume Шуме
- Village
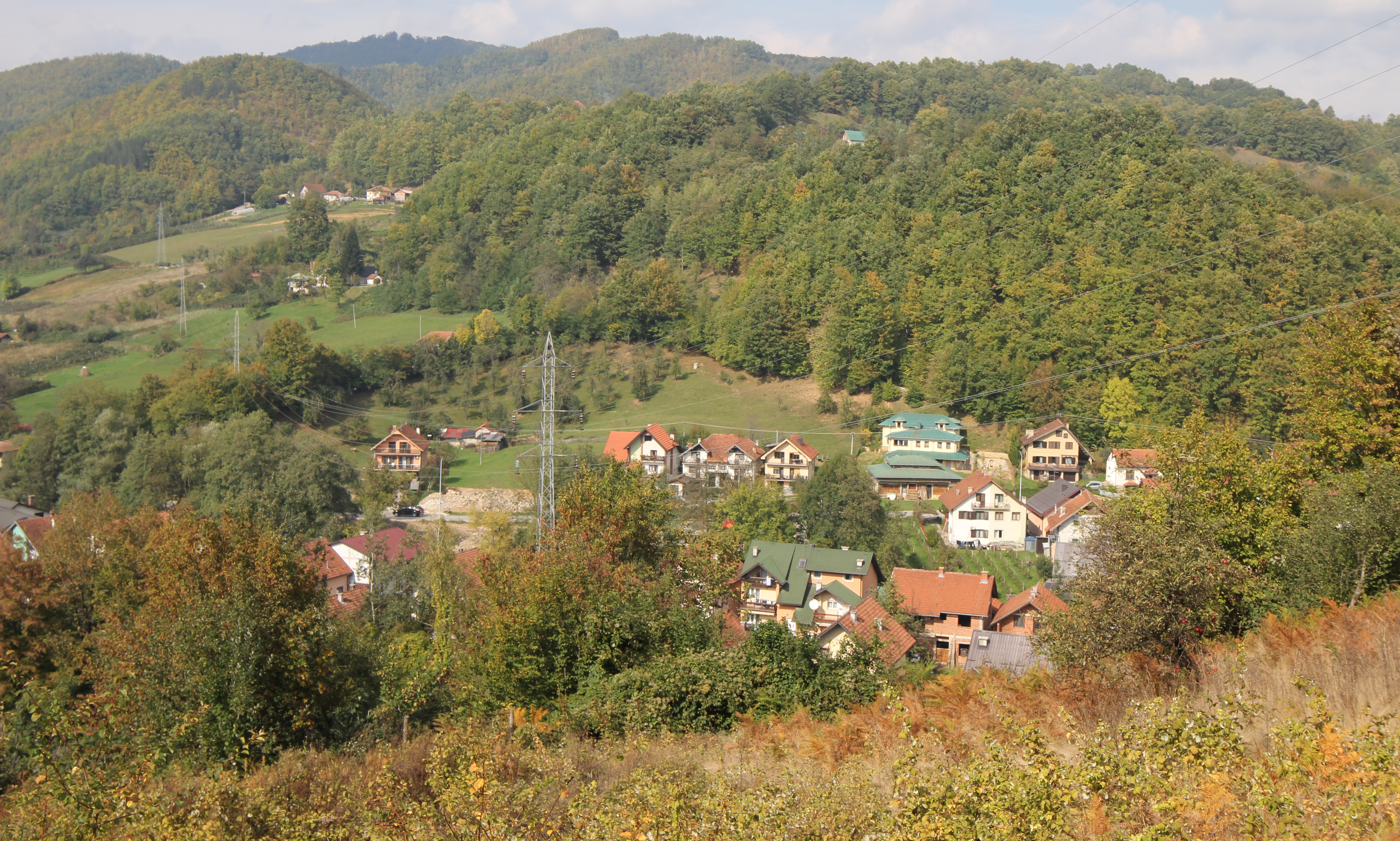
- Bird's-eye view of some of the village

- Location within Serbia
- Coordinates: 43°36′N 20°12′E
- Country: Serbia
- District: Moravica District
- Municipality: Ivanjica

Area
  - Total: 10.96 km^{2} (4.23 sq mi)

Population (2011)
  - Total: 1,250
  - Density: 114/km^{2} (295/sq mi)
- Time zone: UTC+1 (CET)
  - Summer (DST): UTC+2 (CEST)

Šume is a village in the municipality of Ivanjica, Serbia. According to the 2011 census, the village has a population of 1,250 inhabitants.
