= Pogled, Arilje =

Pogled Поглед
- Village
- Location within Serbia
- Coordinates: 43°44′50″N 20°04′59″E
- Country: Serbia
- Region: Raška
- District: Zlatibor
- Municipality: Arilje

Area
  - Total: 4.11 km^{2} (1.59 sq mi)
- Elevation: 399 m (1,309 ft)

Population (2011)
  - Total: 659
  - Density: 160/km^{2} (415/sq mi)
- Time zone: UTC+1 (CET)
  - Summer (DST): UTC+2 (CEST)

Pogled is a village in the municipality of Arilje, Serbia. According to the 2011 census, the village has a population of 659 inhabitants.

== Population ==
Population of Pogled
1948	1953	1961	1971	1981	1991	2002	2011
388	383	358	336	449	588	627	659
