= Arilje =

Arilje Ариље (Serbian)
- Town and municipality
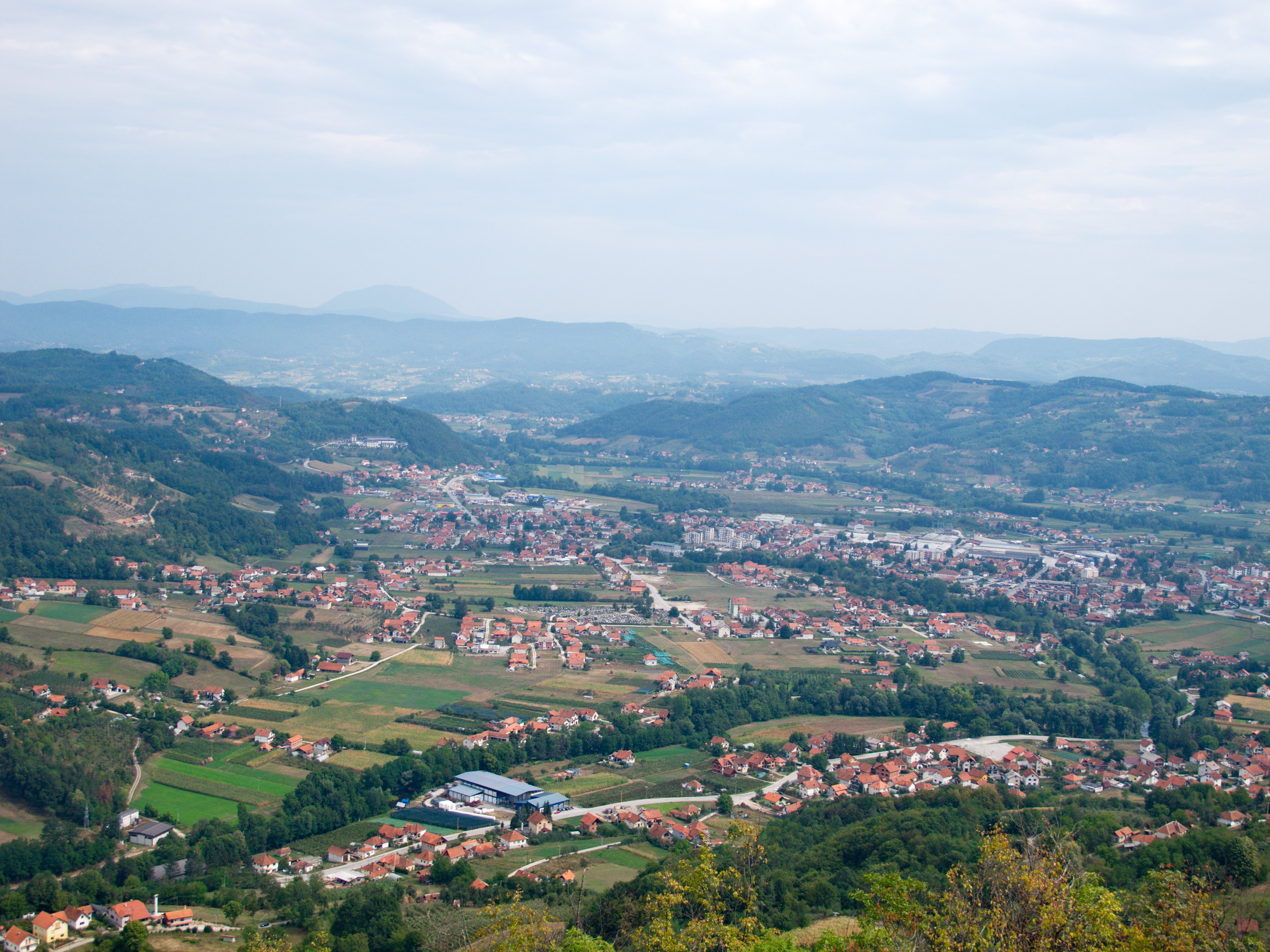
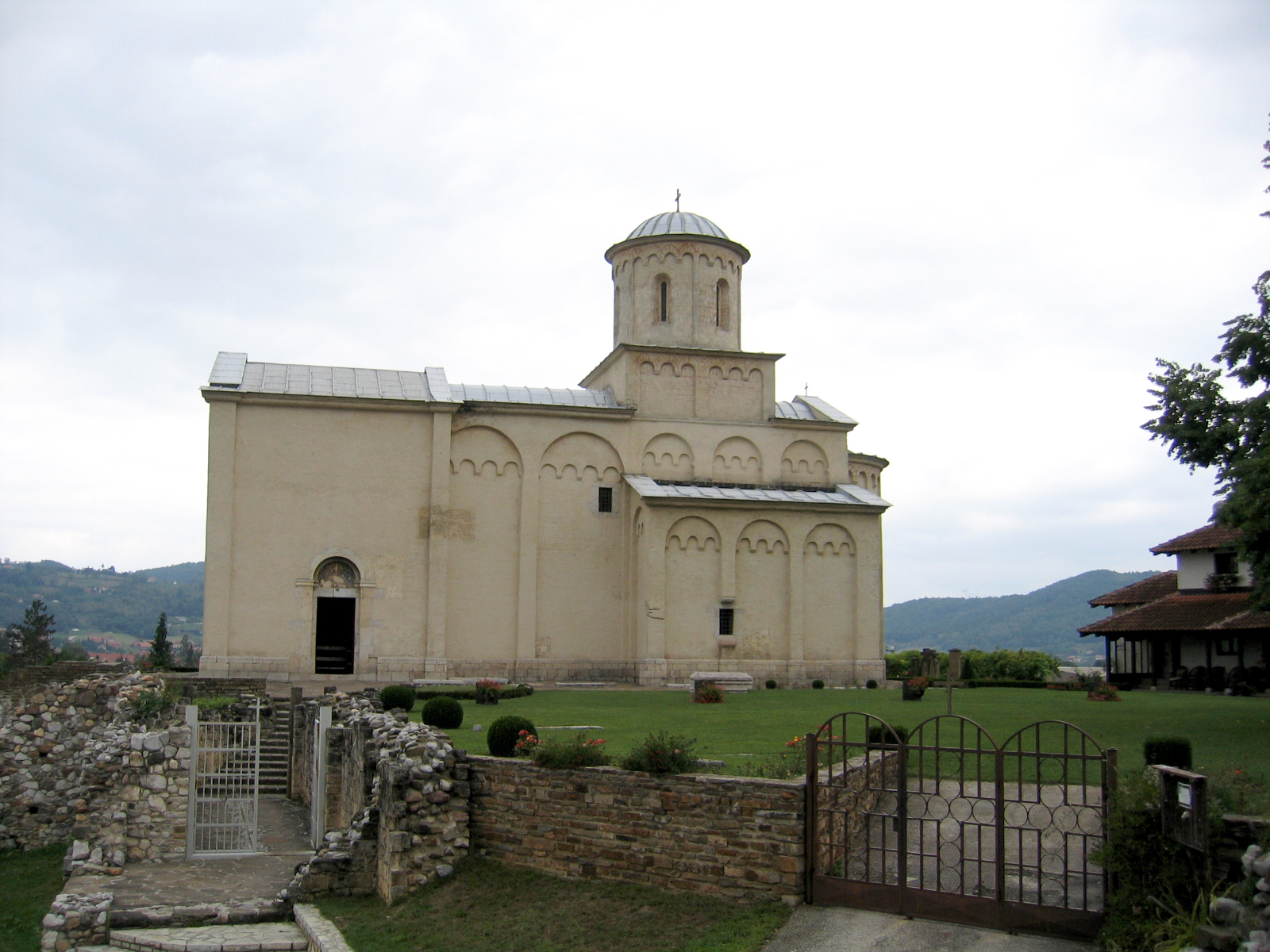
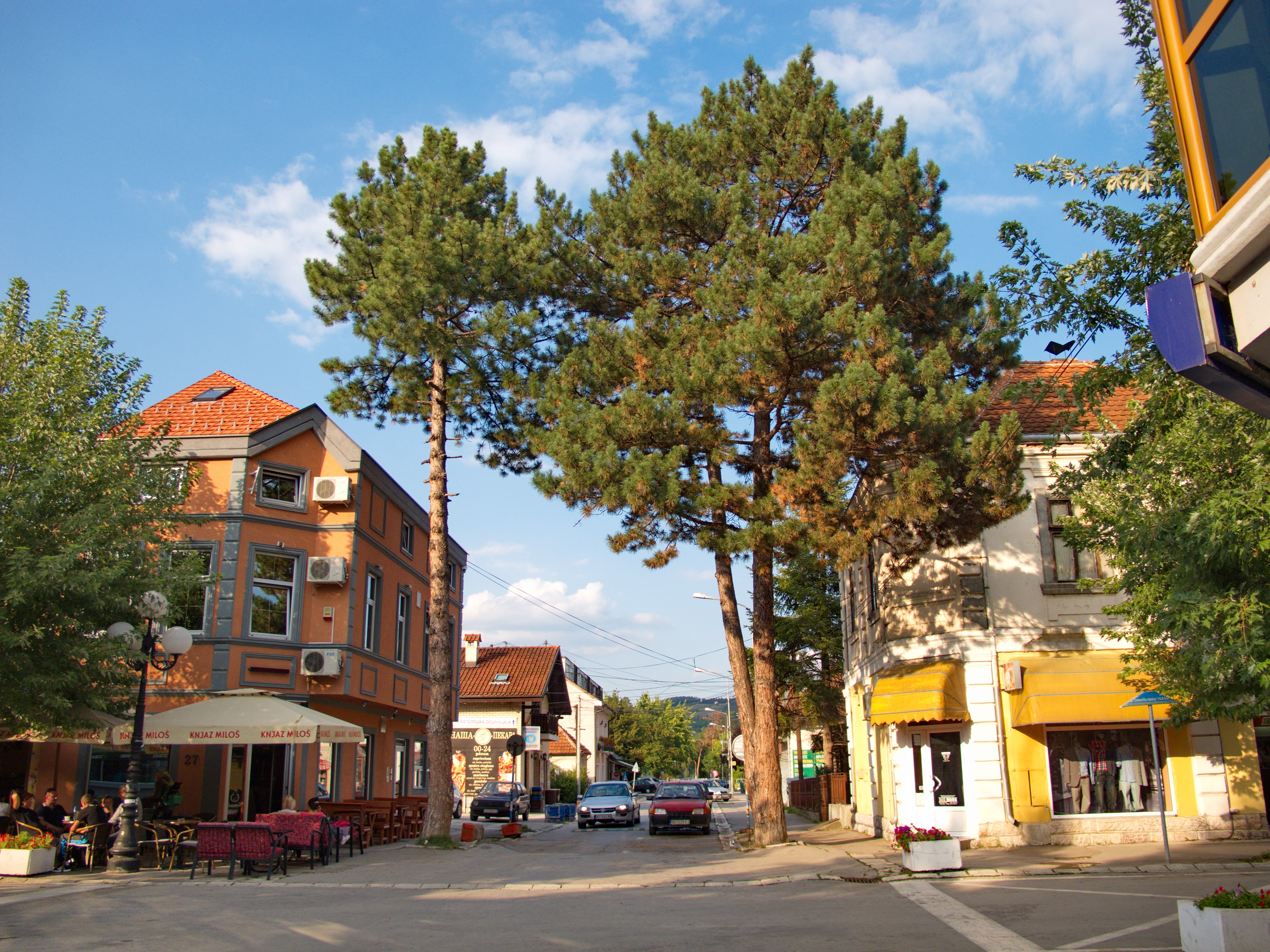
- Clockwise, from top: Panorama of Arilje, town center promenade, 13th century Saint Achillius Church

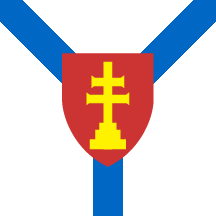
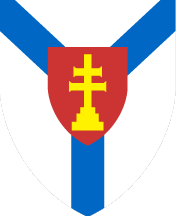
- Flag Coat of arms

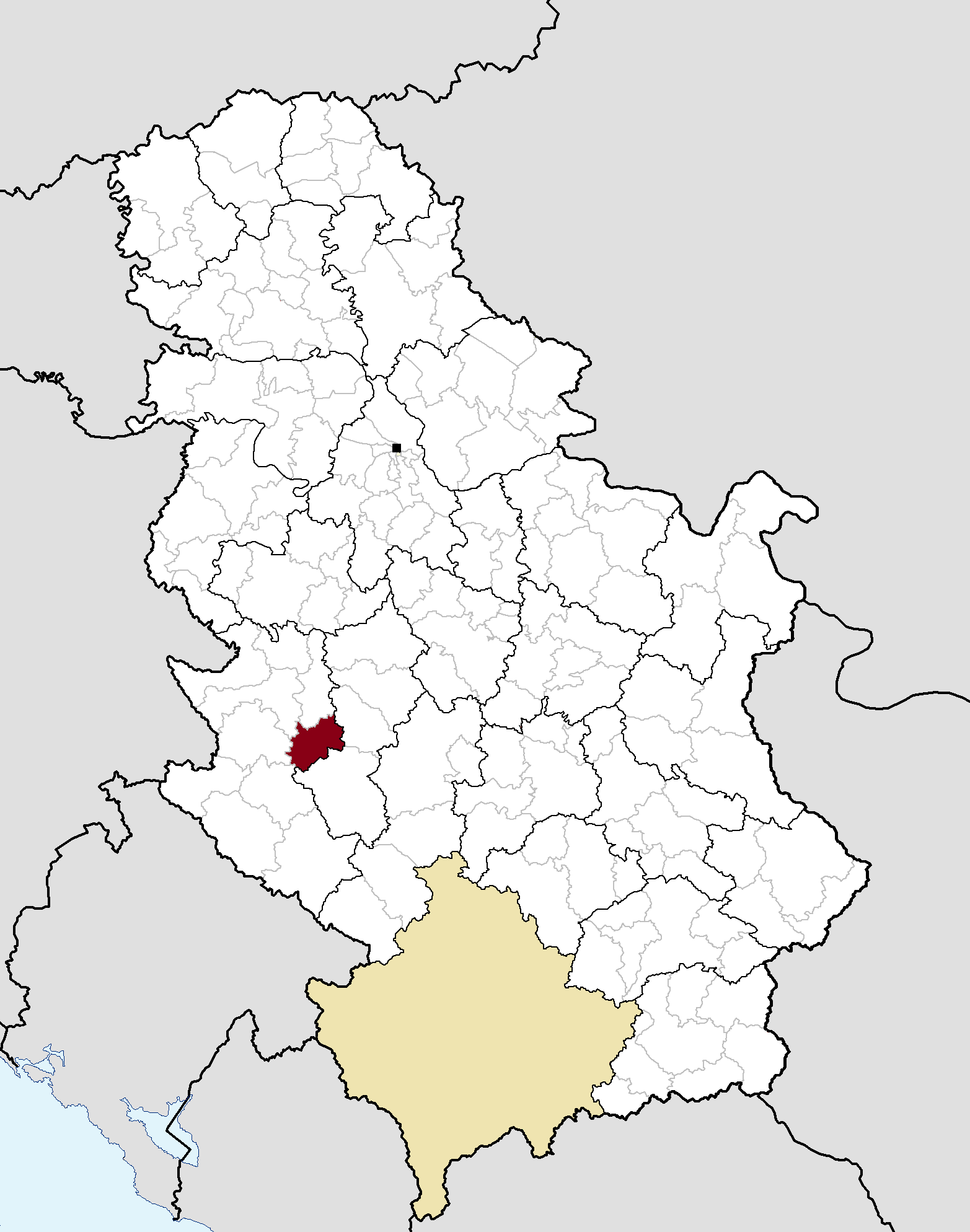
- Location of the municipality of Arilje within Serbia
- Coordinates: 43°45′05″N 20°05′55″E
- Country: Serbia
- Region: Šumadija and Western Serbia
- District: Zlatibor
- Town status: 1880
- Founder: Milan Obrenović IV
- Settlements: 22

Government
  - Mayor: Predrag Maslar (SNS)

Area
  - Town: 3.94 km^{2} (1.52 sq mi)
  - Municipality: 349.06 km^{2} (134.77 sq mi)
- Elevation: 350 m (1,150 ft)
- Highest elevation: 1,382 m (4,534 ft)

Population (2022 census)
  - Town: 6,639
  - Town density: 1,690/km^{2} (4,360/sq mi)
  - Municipality: 17,063
  - Municipality density: 48.883/km^{2} (126.61/sq mi)
- Time zone: UTC+1 (CET)
  - Summer (DST): UTC+2 (CEST)
- Postal code: 31230
- Area code: +381(0)31
- Car plates: UE
- Website: www.arilje.org.rs

Arilje (Serbian Cyrillic: Ариље, pronounced [ǎriːʎɛ]) is a town and municipality located in the Zlatibor District of southwestern Serbia. The population of the town is 6,639, while the municipality has 17,063 inhabitants (2022 census).

== Geography ==
The municipality of Arilje is in western Serbia in the river basins of the mountain rivers of the Rzav and Moravica. It has an altitude of 330 to 1,382 meters.

The municipality's seat is at the confluence of the Rzav and Moravica rivers.

=== Climate ===
Arilje has a humid continental climate (Köppen climate classification: Dfb), that's very close to an oceanic climate (Köppen climate classification: Cfb).

Climate data for Arilje
| Month | Jan | Feb | Mar | Apr | May | Jun | Jul | Aug | Sep | Oct | Nov | Dec | Year |
|---|---|---|---|---|---|---|---|---|---|---|---|---|---|
| Mean daily maximum °C (°F) | 3.6 (38.5) | 6.5 (43.7) | 11.9 (53.4) | 15.9 (60.6) | 20.6 (69.1) | 24.3 (75.7) | 26.4 (79.5) | 26.7 (80.1) | 23.1 (73.6) | 17.5 (63.5) | 9.9 (49.8) | 5.3 (41.5) | 16.0 (60.7) |
| Daily mean °C (°F) | 0.0 (32.0) | 2.4 (36.3) | 6.7 (44.1) | 10.5 (50.9) | 15.1 (59.2) | 18.7 (65.7) | 20.4 (68.7) | 20.4 (68.7) | 16.9 (62.4) | 12.1 (53.8) | 6.0 (42.8) | 2.0 (35.6) | 10.9 (51.7) |
| Mean daily minimum °C (°F) | −3.6 (25.5) | −1.7 (28.9) | 1.6 (34.9) | 5.2 (41.4) | 9.7 (49.5) | 13.1 (55.6) | 14.5 (58.1) | 14.2 (57.6) | 10.8 (51.4) | 6.8 (44.2) | 2.1 (35.8) | −1.3 (29.7) | 5.9 (42.7) |
| Average precipitation mm (inches) | 64 (2.5) | 59 (2.3) | 60 (2.4) | 70 (2.8) | 91 (3.6) | 87 (3.4) | 77 (3.0) | 64 (2.5) | 67 (2.6) | 71 (2.8) | 83 (3.3) | 78 (3.1) | 871 (34.3) |
Source: Climate-Data.org

== History ==
In 1219 Sava Nemanjić proclaimed the Arilje monastery the seat of the Moravica episcopate that covered the territory of Arilje, Užice, Valjevo and Čačak. The first Serbian Orthodox Archbishop and later Metropolitan held court here. In 1296 king Dragutin Nemanjić erected a church, also called St. Achileus.

The Klisura monastery, 13 km away from Arilje, on the road to Ivanjica, is dedicated to the archangels Michael and Gabriel, and was destroyed and reconstructed several times during its turbulent history. Today it is a convent. The oldest secular buildings preserved to this day are the house of colonel Jovan Mićić from 1823 and the old school founded in 1834.

In 1880, by decree of prince Milan Obrenović, Arilje was awarded the status of town.

King Milan Obrenović declared Arilje a municipality in 1882.

== Settlements ==
Aside from the town of Arilje, the municipality includes the following settlements:

- Bjeluša
- Bogojevići
- Brekovo
- Cerova
- Dobrače
- Dragojevac
- Grdovići
- Grivska
- Kruščica
- Latvica
- Mirosaljci
- Pogled
- Radobuđa
- Radoševo
- Severovo
- Stupčevići
- Trešnjevica
- Vigošte
- Virovo
- Visoka
- Vrane

== Demographics ==
Historical population
| Year | Pop. | ±% p.a. |
|---|---|---|
| 1948 | 20,316 | — |
| 1953 | 20,882 | +0.55% |
| 1961 | 20,001 | −0.54% |
| 1971 | 19,581 | −0.21% |
| 1981 | 20,111 | +0.27% |
| 1991 | 20,335 | +0.11% |
| 2002 | 19,784 | −0.25% |
| 2011 | 18,792 | −0.57% |
| 2022 | 17,063 | −0.87% |

According to the 2011 census results, the municipality of Arilje had a population of 18,792 inhabitants.

=== Ethnic groups ===
The ethnic composition of the municipality:

| Ethnic group | Population | % |
|---|---|---|
| Serbs | 18,407 | 97.95% |
| Roma | 120 | 0.64% |
| Montenegrins | 22 | 0.12% |
| Muslims | 10 | 0.05% |
| Macedonians | 9 | 0.05% |
| Bulgarians | 8 | 0.04% |
| Croats | 8 | 0.04% |
| Others | 208 | 1.11% |
| Total | 18,792 | |

== Economy ==
As of 2012, Arilje has a total of 4,793 registered agricultural entities (farmsteads).

The following table gives a preview of total number of registered people employed in legal entities per their core activity (as of 2022):

| Activity | Total |
|---|---|
| Agriculture, forestry and fishing | 55 |
| Mining and quarrying | 7 |
| Manufacturing | 3,166 |
| Electricity, gas, steam and air conditioning supply | 27 |
| Water supply; sewerage, waste management and remediation activities | 148 |
| Construction | 191 |
| Wholesale and retail trade, repair of motor vehicles and motorcycles | 598 |
| Transportation and storage | 181 |
| Accommodation and food services | 164 |
| Information and communication | 26 |
| Financial and insurance activities | 47 |
| Real estate activities | - |
| Professional, scientific and technical activities | 110 |
| Administrative and support service activities | 134 |
| Public administration and defense; compulsory social security | 172 |
| Education | 339 |
| Human health and social work activities | 158 |
| Arts, entertainment and recreation | 49 |
| Other service activities | 74 |
| Individual agricultural workers | 419 |
| Total | 6,065 |

== Music festival ==
The classical music festival "Arlemm" is held annually in the municipality of Arilje.

== Gallery ==
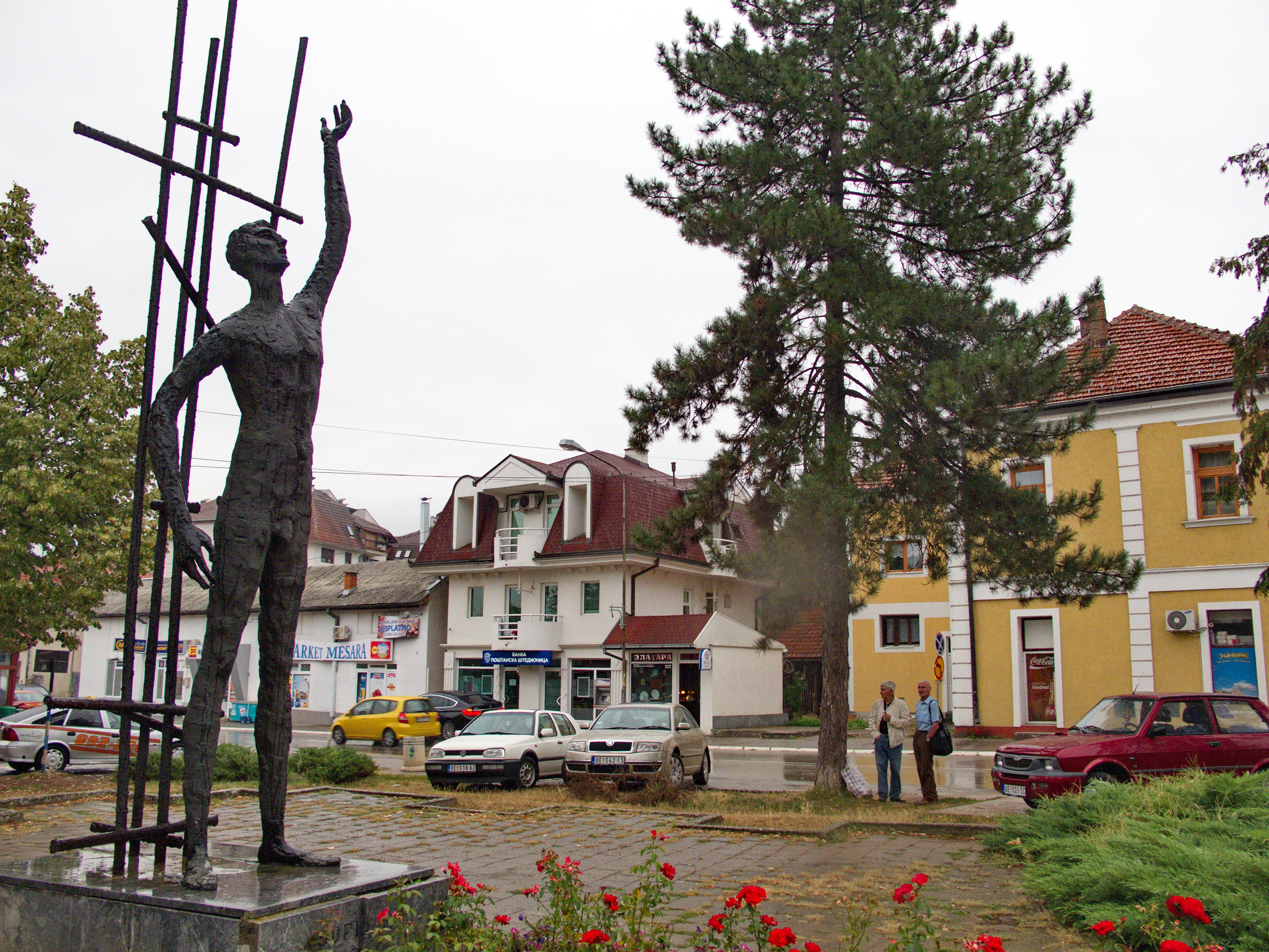
Town center promenade, monument to the "Unknown soldier"

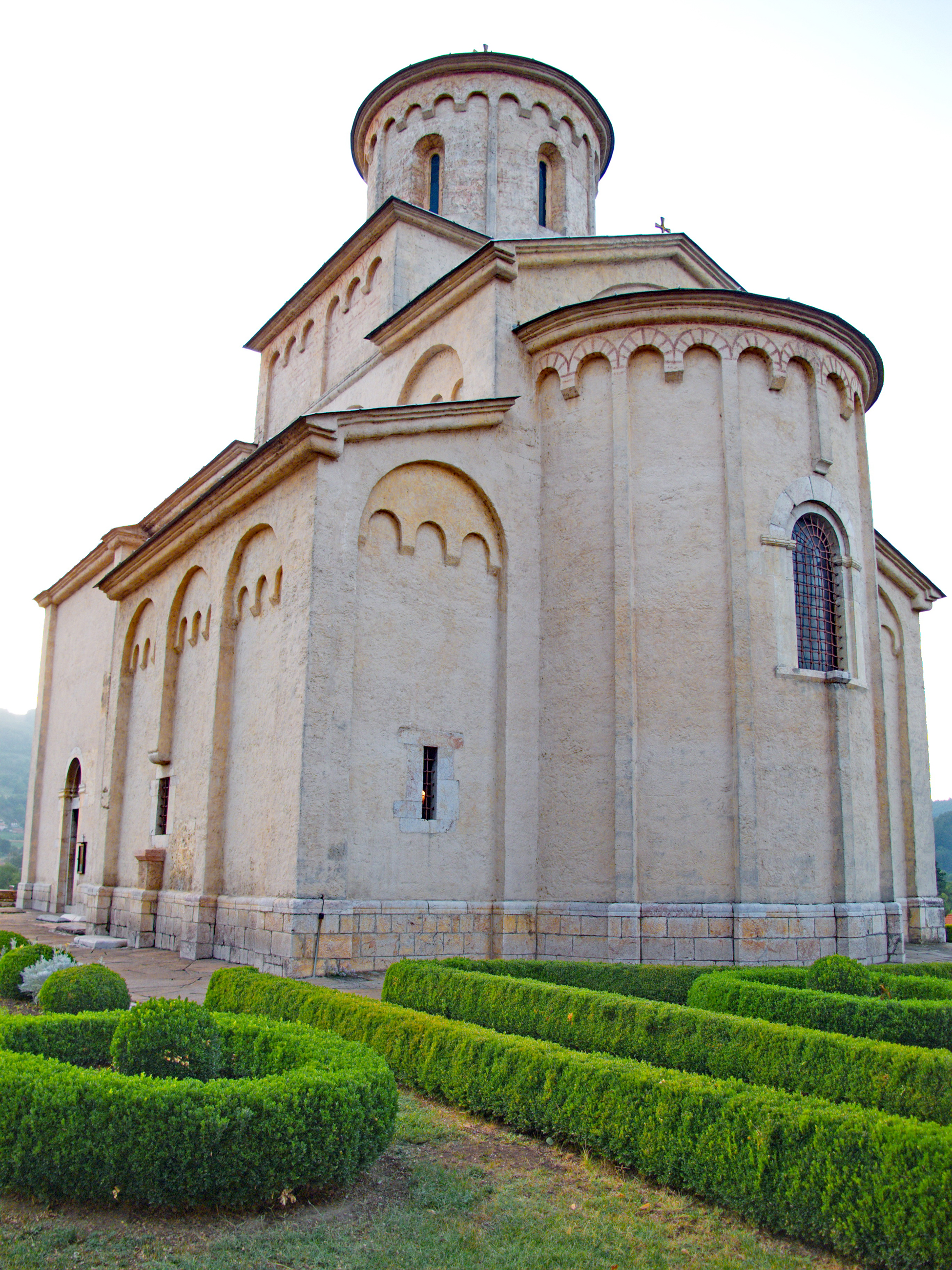
Church of St. Achillius

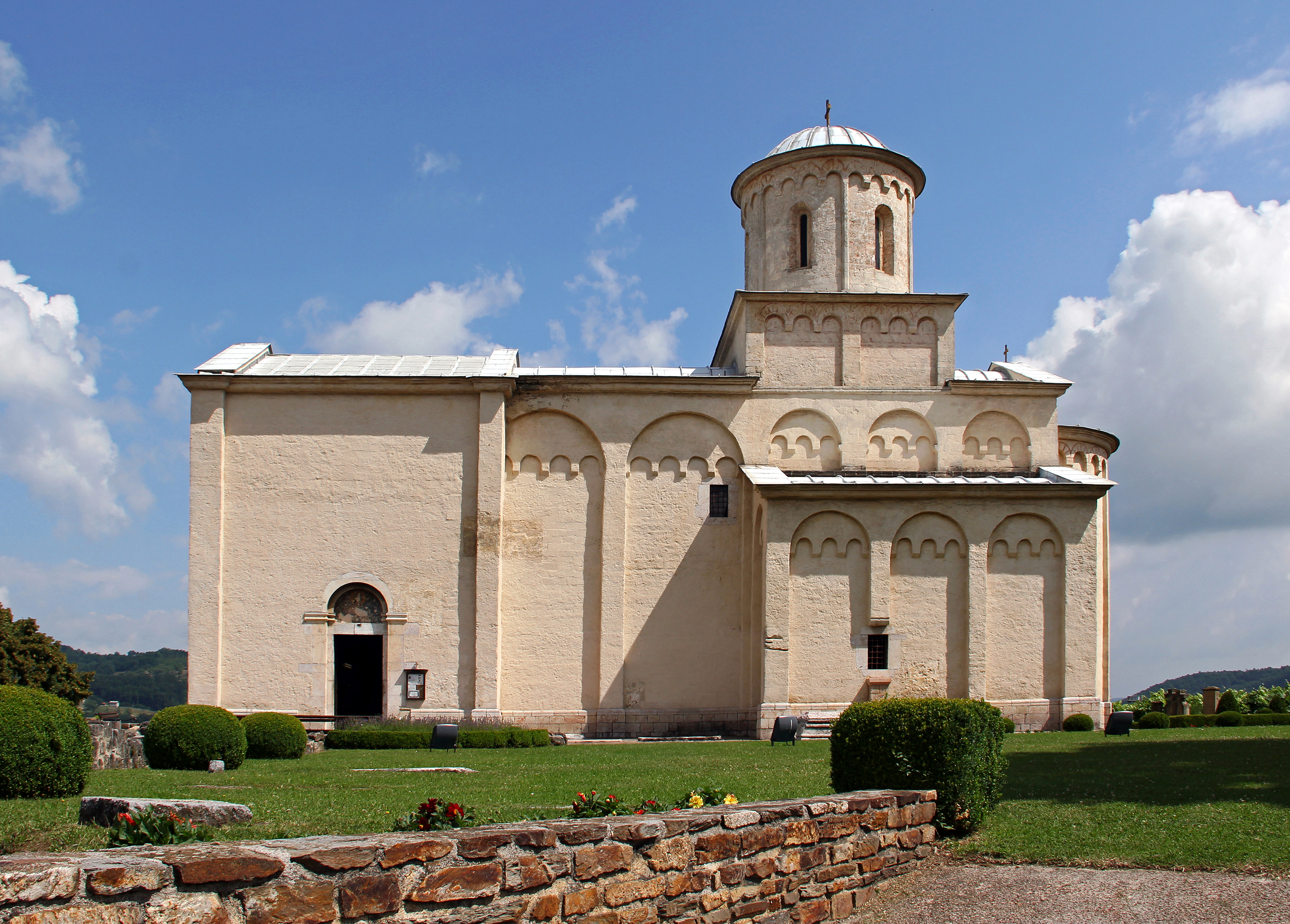
Church of St. Achillius

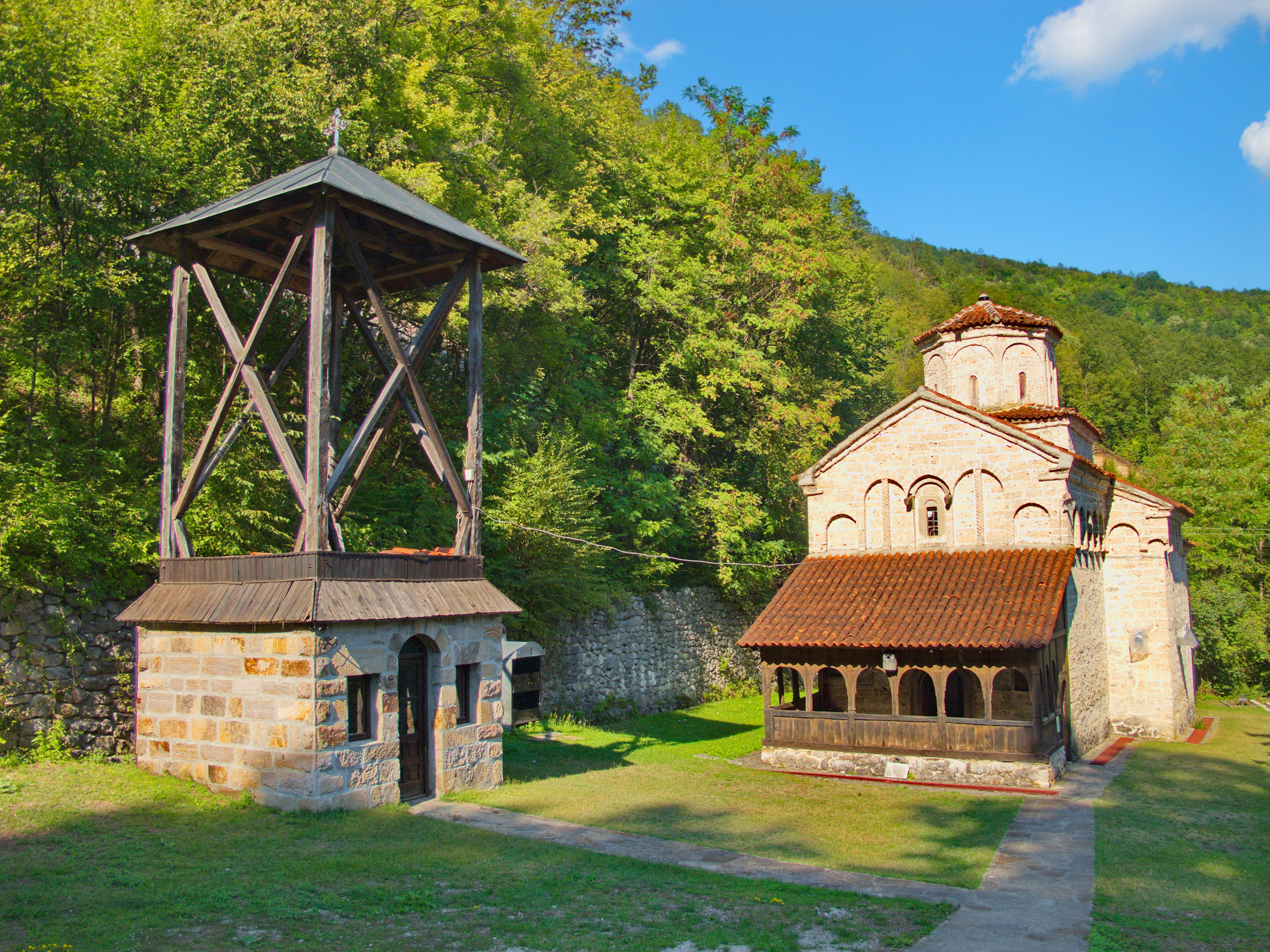
Klisura Monastery

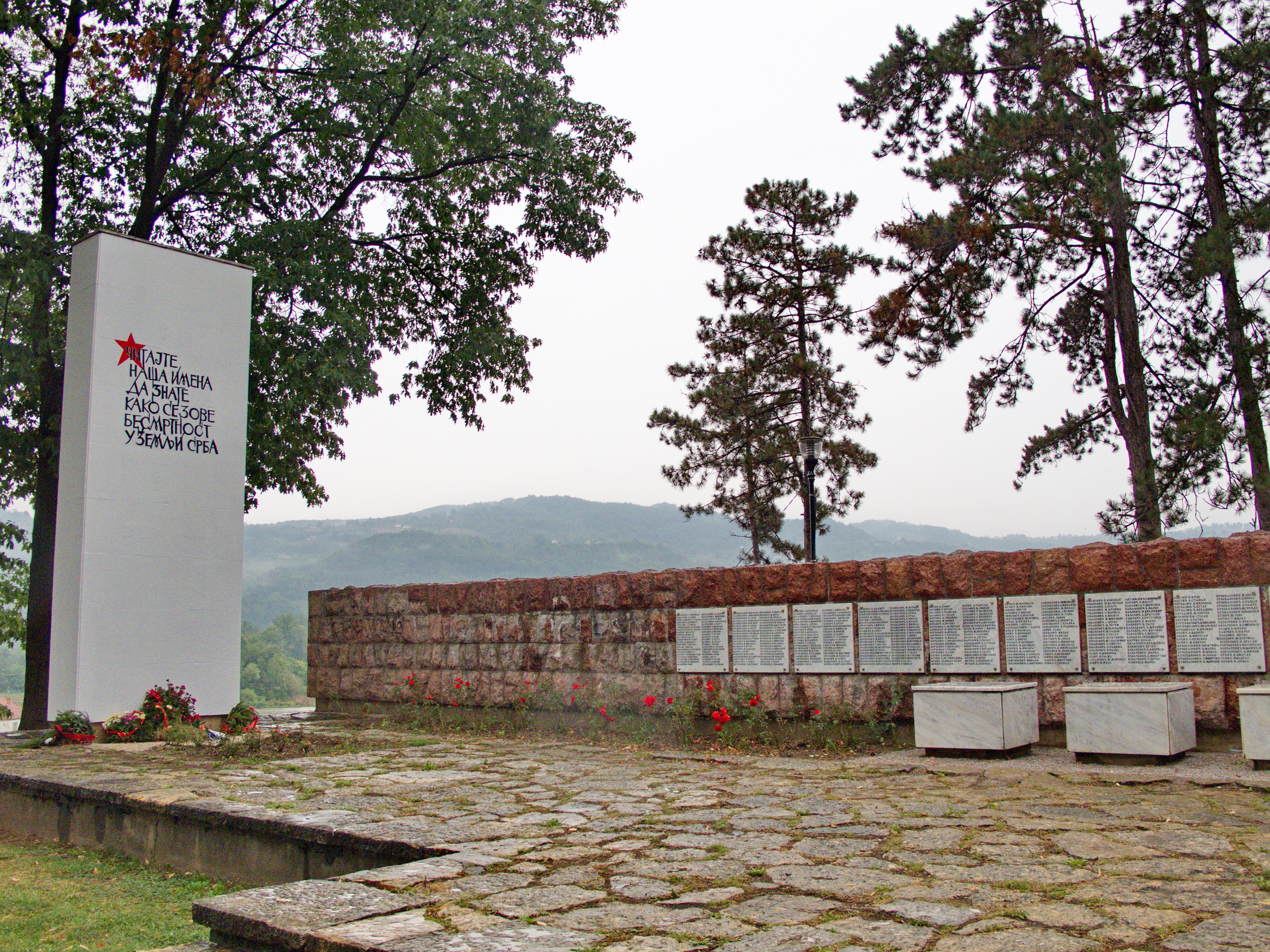
Monument to the fallen soldiers in town park

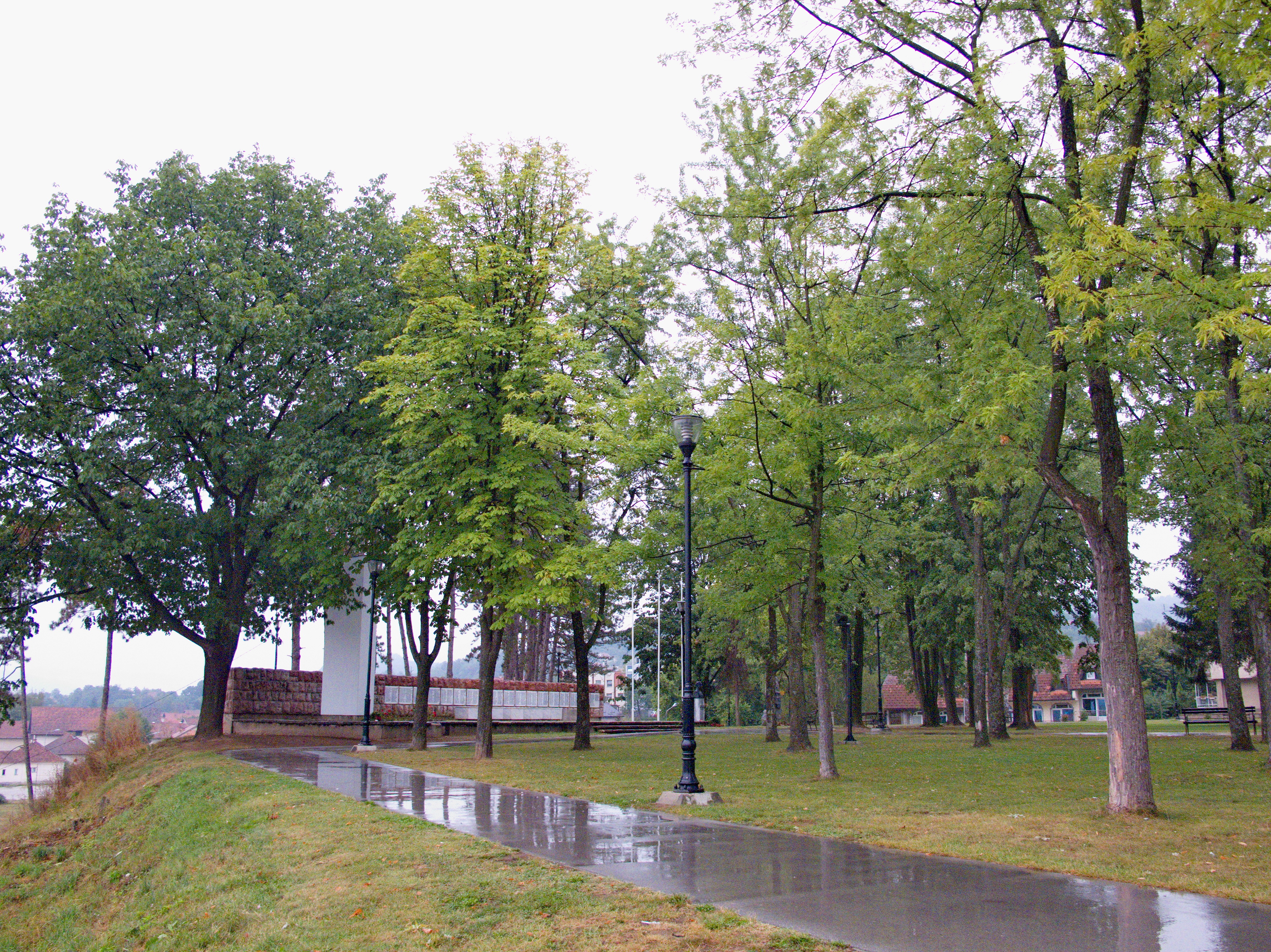
Town park

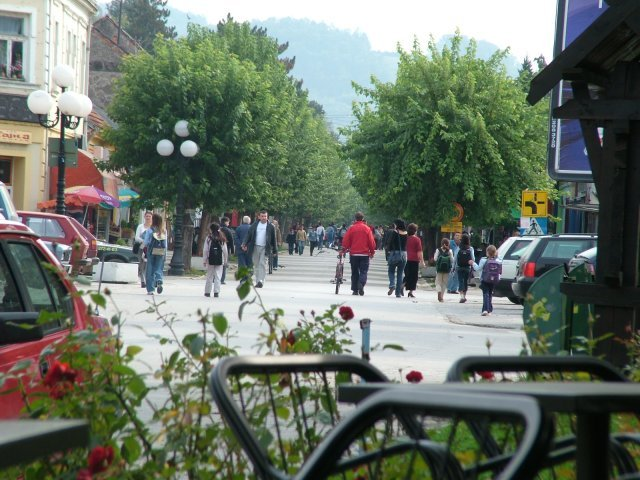
Town center street

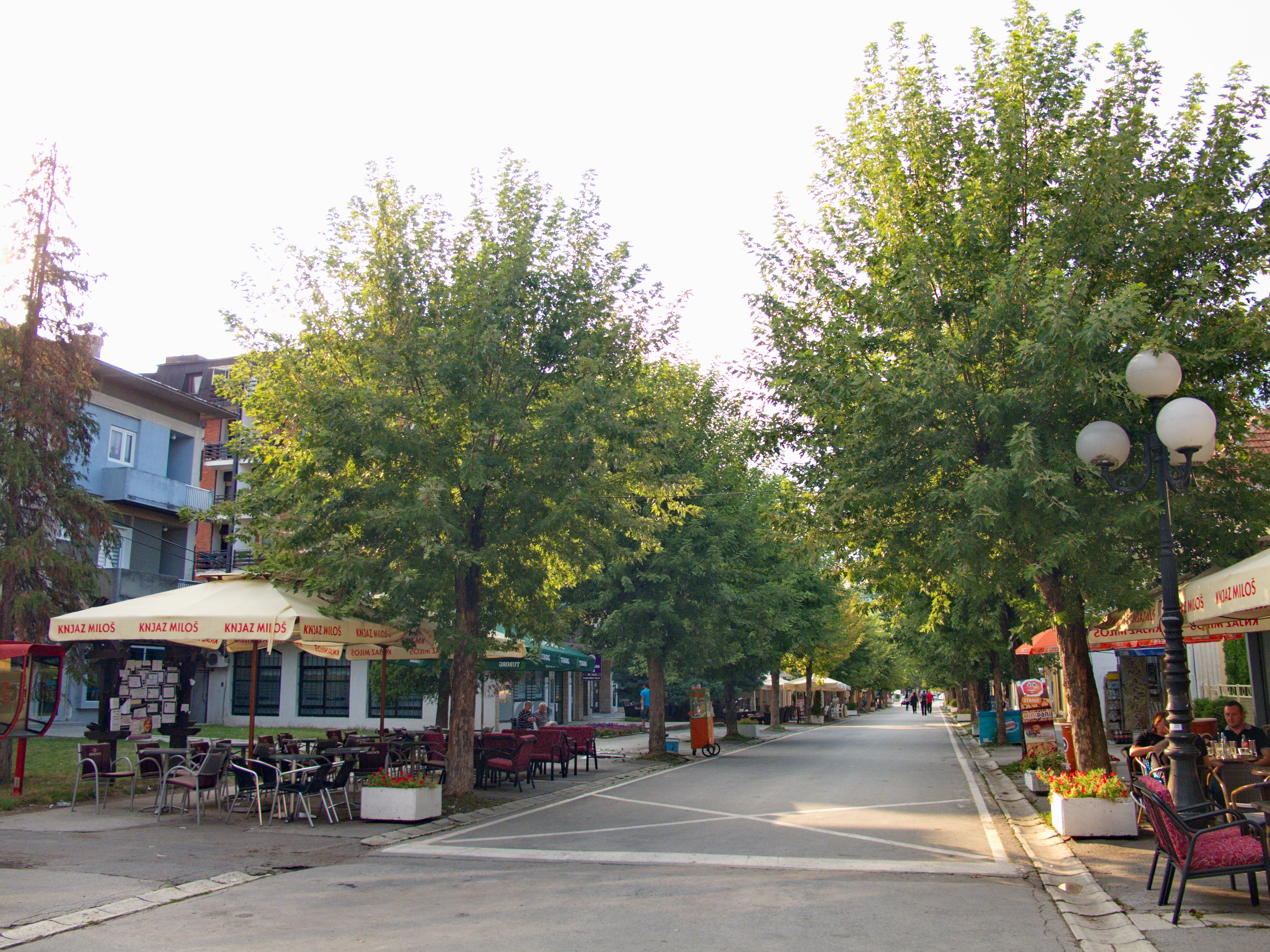
Town center promenade

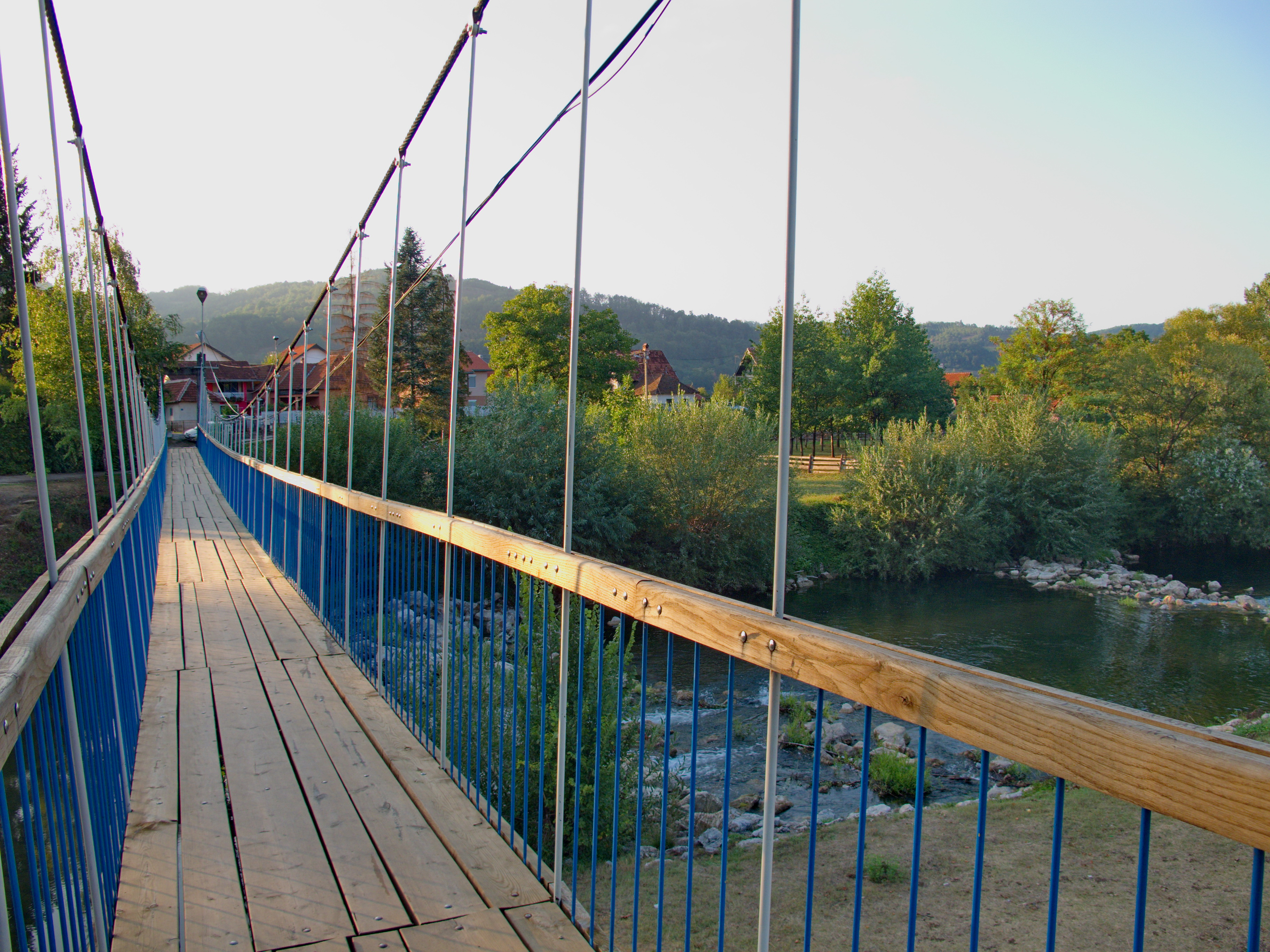
Footbridge over River Rzav at the City Beach

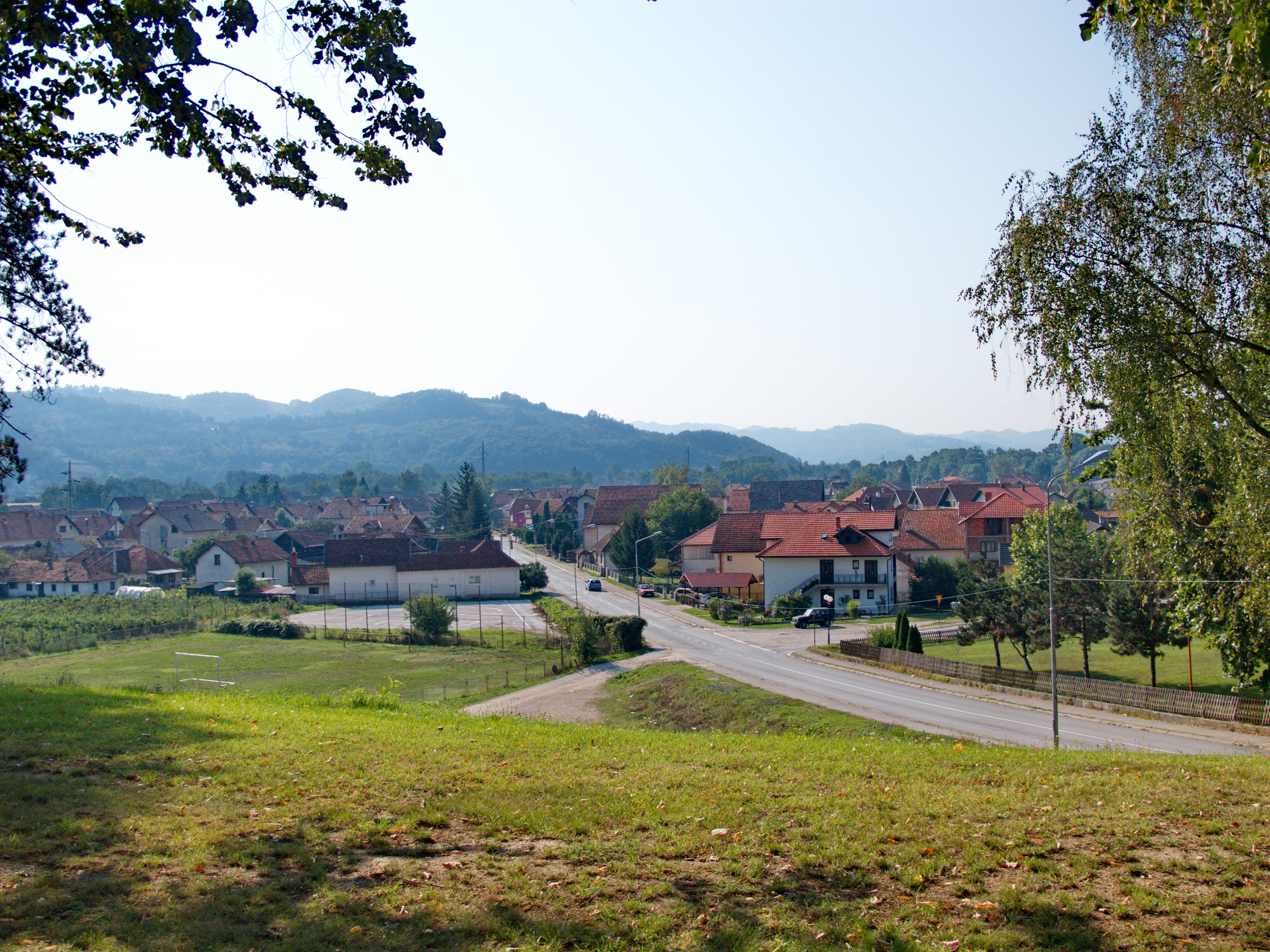
View of the part of the town
