= Trešnjevica (Arilje) =

- Village
- Location within Serbia
- Coordinates: 43°40′N 20°10′E
- Country: Serbia
- District: Šumadija
- Municipality: Arilje

Area
  - Total: 25.33 km^{2} (9.78 sq mi)
- Elevation: 695 m (2,280 ft)

Population (2011)
  - Total: 826
  - Density: 32.6/km^{2} (84.5/sq mi)
- Time zone: UTC+1 (CET)
  - Summer (DST): UTC+2 (CEST)

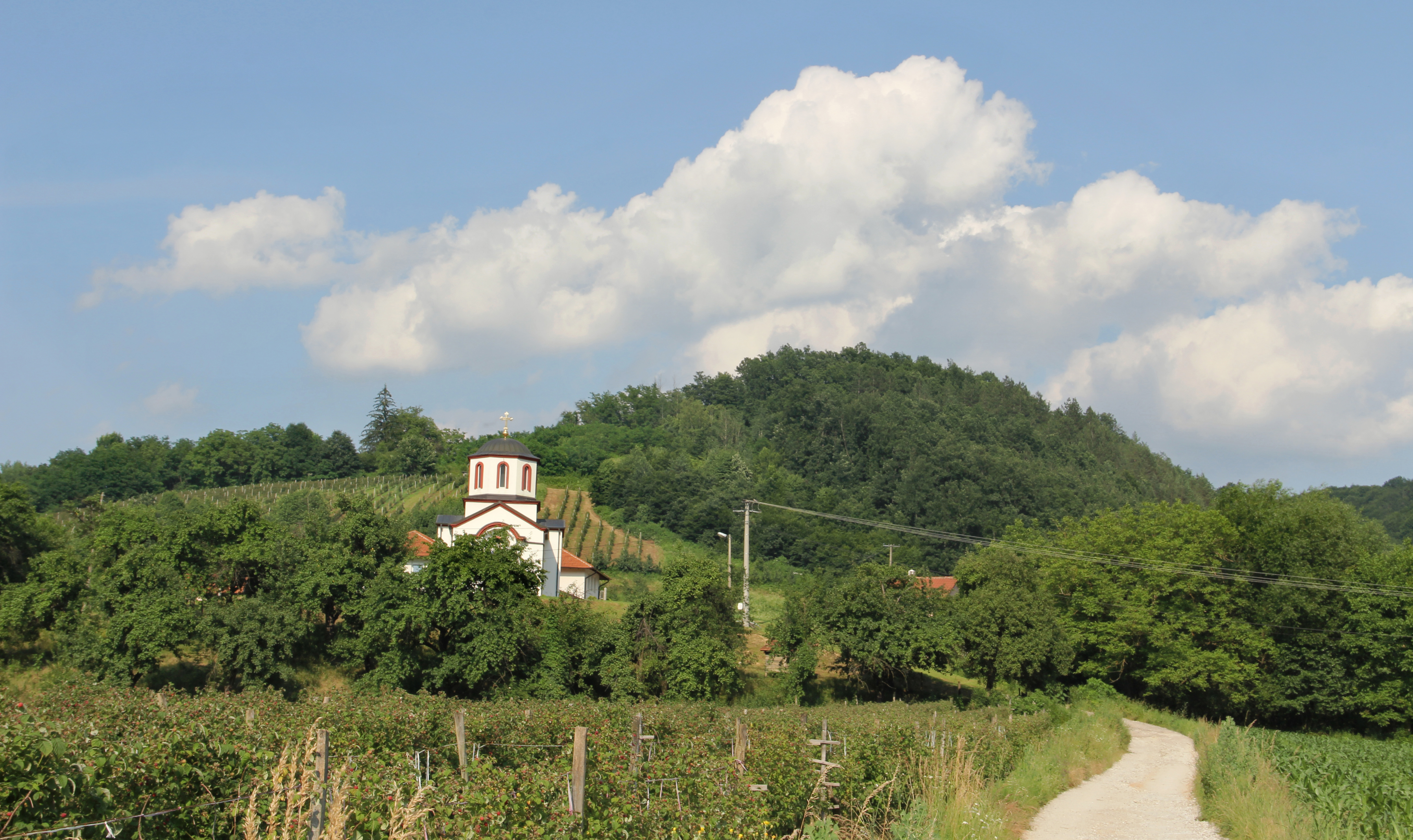
Church of St. Nicholas of Zica, village of Tresnjevica, Municipality of Arilje, Serbia.

Trešnjevica is a village in the municipality of Arilje, Serbia. According to the 2011 census, the village has a population of 826 people.
