= Blagaja =

Mountain in Serbia

Blagaja Благаја
- Location within Serbia

Highest point
- Elevation: 844 m (2,769 ft)
- Coordinates: 43°46′22″N 20°00′55″E

Geography
- Location: Western Serbia
- Parent range: Dinaric Alps

Blagaja (Serbian Cyrillic: Благаја) is a mountain in western Serbia, near the town of Požega. Its highest peak Ravni krš has an elevation of 844 m (2,769 ft) above sea level.

== See also ==
- List of mountains in Serbia
