= Mučanj =

Mountain in Serbia

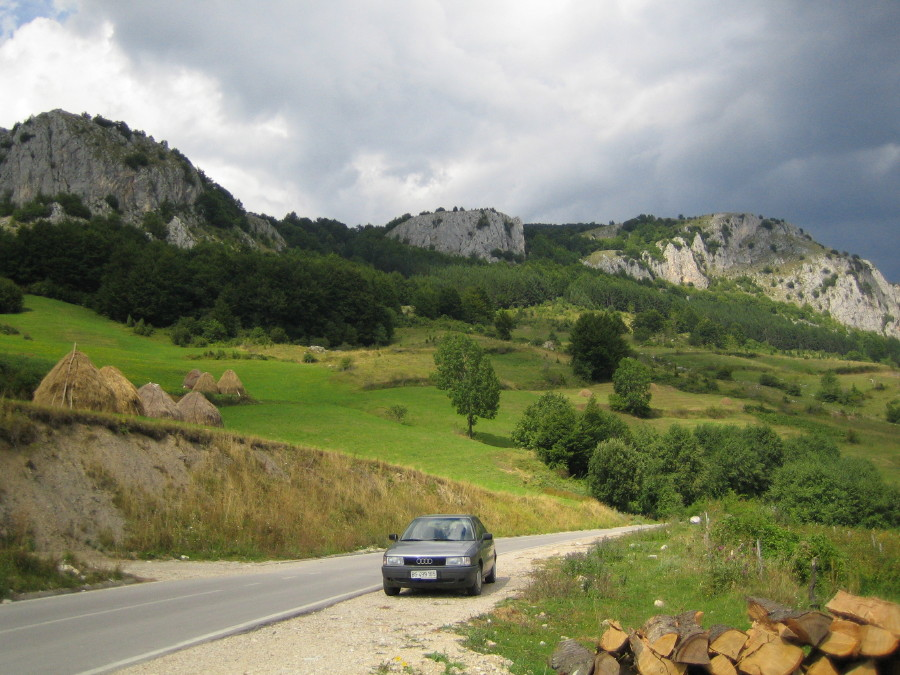

Highest point
- Elevation: 1,534 m (5,033 ft)
- Coordinates: 43°32′44″N 20°02′05″E

Geography
- Location within Serbia
- Location: Western Serbia
- Parent range: Dinaric Alps

Climbing
- Easiest route: Hike from Katići

Mučanj (Serbian Cyrillic: Мучањ) is a mountain in western Serbia, near the town of Ivanjica. Its highest peak, Klekov Vrh (Jerinin grad), has an elevation of 1,534 meters (5,033 ft).

== See also ==
- List of mountains in Serbia
