= Dobrače (Arilje) =

- Village
- Location within Serbia
- Coordinates: 43°38′08″N 20°05′06″E
- Country: Serbia
- District: Šumadija
- Municipality: Arilje

Area
  - Total: 34.03 km^{2} (13.14 sq mi)
- Elevation: 668 m (2,192 ft)

Population (2011)
  - Total: 646
  - Density: 19.0/km^{2} (49.2/sq mi)
- Time zone: UTC+1 (CET)
  - Summer (DST): UTC+2 (CEST)

Dobrače (Serbian: Добраче) is a village in the municipality of Arilje, Serbia. According to the 2011 census, the village has a population of 646 people.
