= Saints Constantine and Helena Church =

Saints Constantine and Helena Church may refer to:

== Australia ==
- Cathedral of Saints Constantine and Helene

== Bulgaria ==
- Church of Sts. Constantine and Helena (Plovdiv)

== Poland ==
- The Orthodox Parish of Saints Constantine and Helen in Zgorzelec

== Romania ==
- Focșani Military Chapel
- Livedea Gospod Church

== North Macedonia ==
- Church of Sts. Constantine and Helena (Skopje)

== Russia ==
- Sts. Constantine and Helen Church, Novocherkassk

== Serbia ==
- Church of Saints Emperor Constantine and Empress Helena

== Turkey ==
- Church of Sts. Constantine and Helen (Edirne)

== United States ==
- Sts. Constantine and Helen Greek Orthodox Cathedral
- Saints Constantine and Helen Greek Orthodox Cathedral of the Pacific (Honolulu)
- Sts. Constantine and Helen Serbian Orthodox Church
- Sts. Constantine and Helen Chapel
- Mosque Maryam (former church)
