= Horse Monument to Platov =

- Russian: Конный памятник Платову (Новочеркасск)
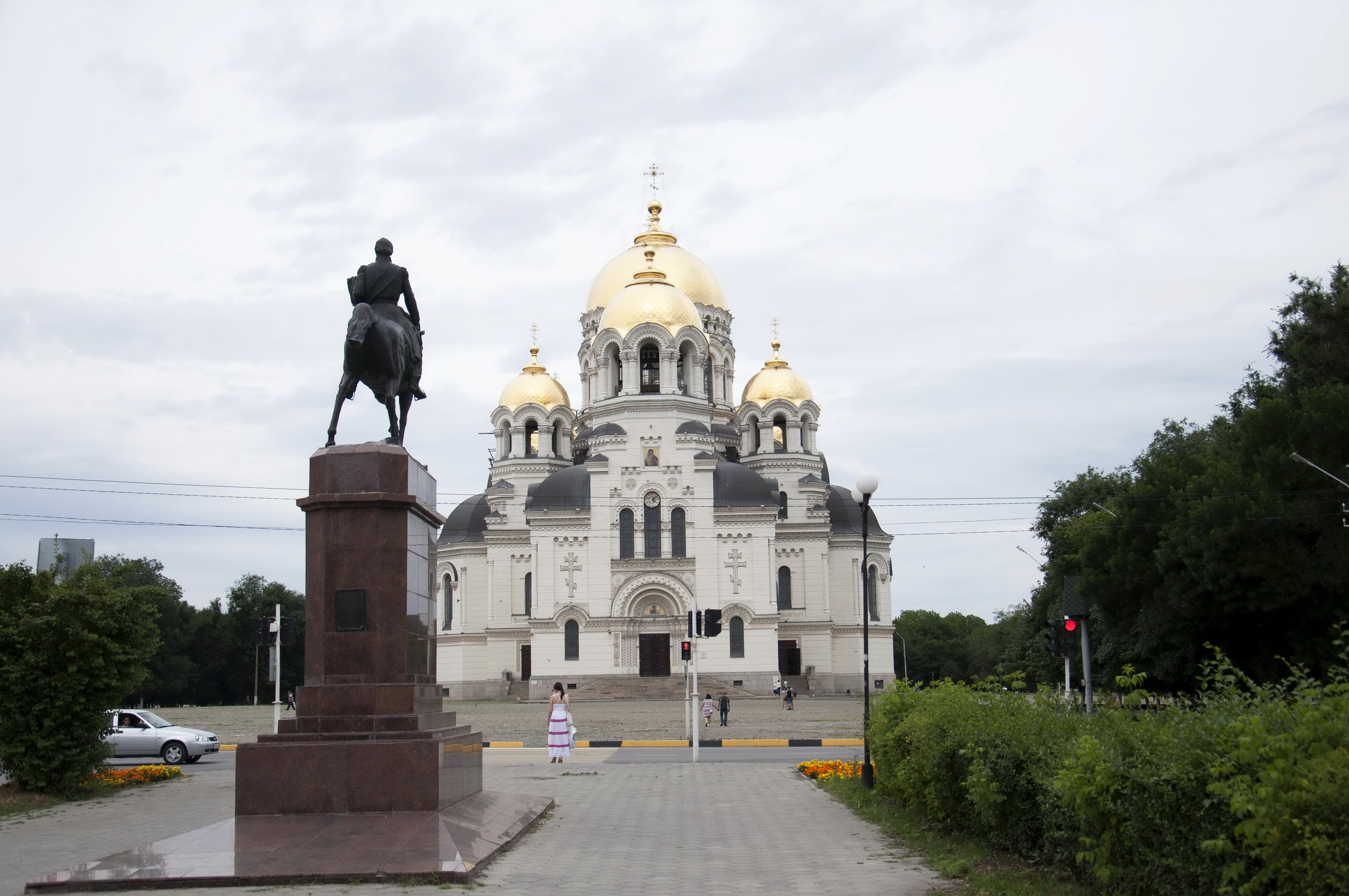
- Monument to Matvei Platov in Novocherkassk
- Interactive map of Horse Monument to Platov
- Location: Novocherkassk, Rostov Oblast, Russia
- Coordinates: 47°24′48″N 40°06′29″E
- Designer: sculptor Sknarin, architect Zhukov
- Opening date: 2003

The Horse Monument to Platov - a monument in the city of Novocherkassk, Rostov Region. The bronze monument to Platov sitting on horseback is set on Platovsky Prospekt in front of the Ascension Cathedral. It was opened in 2003. The authors of the monument are sculptor Sknarin, the Honored Artist of the Russian Federation and architect Zhukov.

== History ==
A bronze monument to the ataman of the Don Cossack Host, General from the Cavalry, who took part in all the wars of the Russian Empire from the end of the XVIII to the beginning of the XIX century, Matvei Ivanovich Platov (1753–1818) on horseback, was built in the city of Novocherkassk, Rostov Region on Platovsky Prospekt near Ascension Cathedral. The monument was opened on August 23, 2003, in the days of the 250th anniversary of the birth of Platov.

The authors of the project of the monument to Platov are the sculptor Sknarin, the Honored Artist of the Russian Federation and the architect Zhukov.

Behind, on the granite pedestal of the monument, a commemorative metal tablet with the inscription: "The monument was installed by the Atamans and Cossacks of the in honor of commemorating the 250th anniversary of the birth of the great son of the Don land, the famous Russian commander, the general from the cavalry, the doctor of the Oxford University, Ataman, Count Matthew Platov. Established under the Army Ataman Vodolack in the reign of the Governor of the Rostov Region Chub, Mayor of Novocherkassk Volkov. The sculptor is A. A. Sknarin. The architect IA Zhukov. It is cast in bronze in the workshop of the Academic Art Master of the RSSU "2003". There is the inscription "Platov Matvey Ivanovich" on the metal plate in the form of a scroll on the front side of the pedestal.

The height of the monument with the pedestal is about eight meters. The height of the bronze bust with a horse is 3 meters 20 centimeters, the weight of the bust is about three tons. The commander Platov sits on a horse, there is a hussar's hat in his hand, his costume is decorated with medals, a saber is fixed on the side. The territory around the monument is landscaped.
