= Baklanov =

Baklanov (Russian: Бакланов; masculine) or Baklanova (feminine) is a Russian surname. Notable people with the surname include:

- Georges Baklanoff (1881–1938), Russian operatic baritone
- Gleb Baklanov (1910–1976), Soviet officer, Hero of the Soviet Union
- Grigory Baklanov (1923–2009), Russian novelist
- Oleg Baklanov (1932–2021), Soviet politician
- Olga Baclanova (sometimes simply "Baclanova"; 1896–1974), Russian actress
- Vera Baklanova (born 1947), Russian diver
- Yakov Baklanov (1809–1873), Russian general, hero of the Caucasian War (see Monument to Yakov Baklanov)
