= Church of Our Lady of the Don (Novocherkassk) =

Orthodox church in Rostov Oblast, Russia

Coordinates: 47.4441°N 40.1049°E

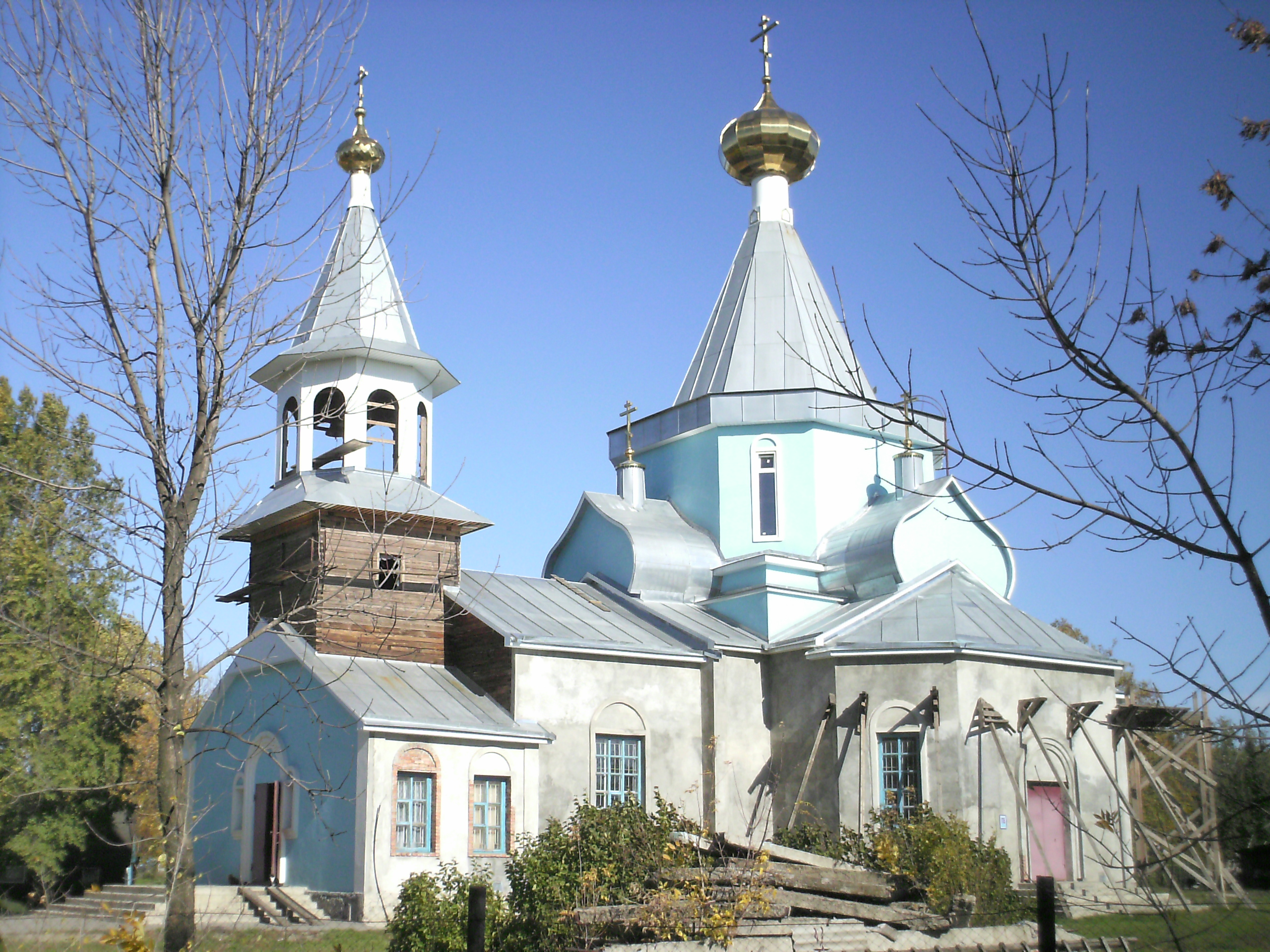

Religion
- Affiliation: Russian Orthodox

Location
- Location: Novocherkassk, Rostov Oblast Russia
- Interactive map of Church of Our Lady of the Don

Architecture
- Completed: 2013

Church of Our Lady of the Don is a Russian Orthodox church in the city of Novocherkassk, Rostov Oblast, Russia.

== History ==
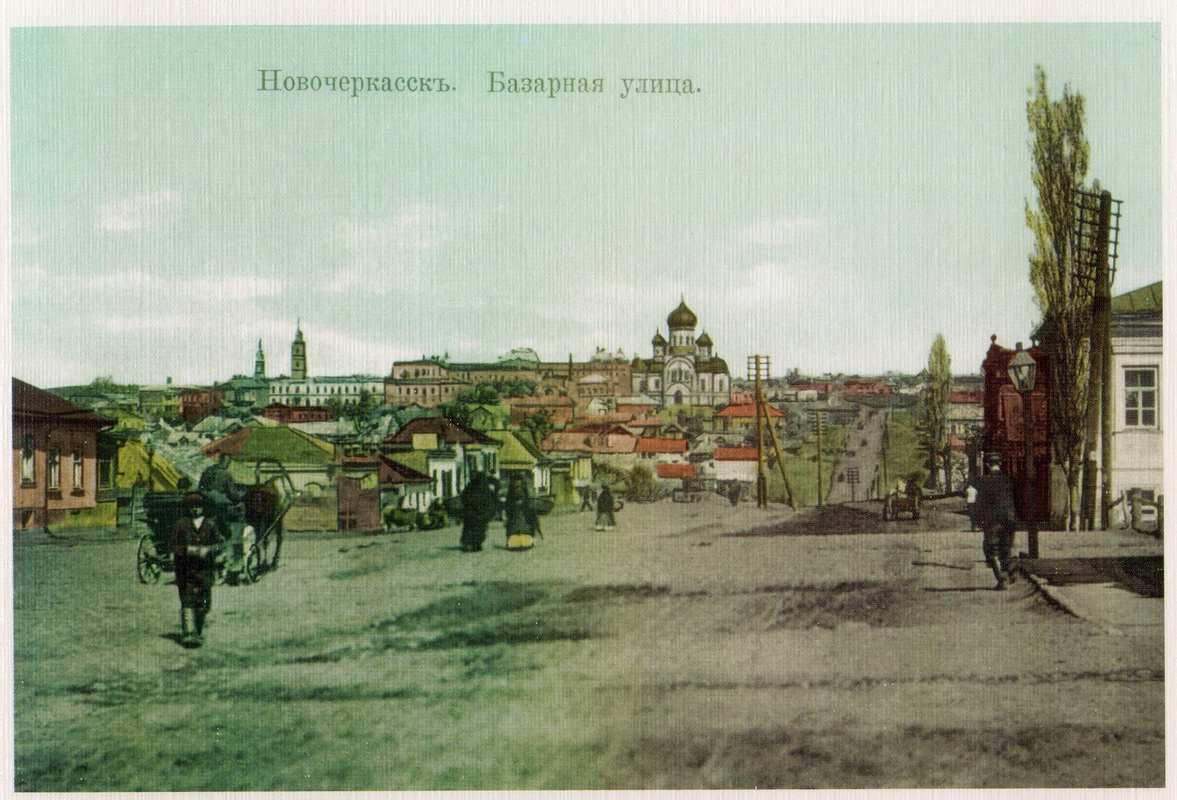
Church of Our Lady of the Don at a postcard, the beginning of the 20th century

In 1891 in Japan, the heir to the Russian throne ― Nikolai Alexandrovich (the future Tsar Nicholas II), who also was the ataman of all Cossack armies, including Don Army, survived an assassination attempt. To honor this event on April 29, 1893 (the second anniversary of his rescue), Novocherkassk dwellers petitioned the archbishop Don and Novocherkassk Macarius with the request to allow them to build a church dedicated to Our Lady of the Don icon. The blessing was given.

On behalf of the Emperor Alexander III the permission to build a new church in Novocherkassk was given. Documents on the construction of the church have not survived. Judging from the old photos, the church was a one-storey, had five domes and was built of white stone. The architect was S.I. Boldyrev. The iconostasis of the church was painted by the artist E.G. Cherepakhin, who also designed Novocherkassk Ascension Cathedral. In 1903, the church was built and consecrated.

It is known that the church still existed in 1930, but the accurate data on the time of its destruction is not available for public.

The modern church was founded in 1992, but after laying of the foundation construction works were suspended for nine years. It has started to function only in 2013.
