= St. Dimitry's Church, Novocherkassk =

Coordinates: 47.4141°N 40.0683°E

St. Dimitry's Church
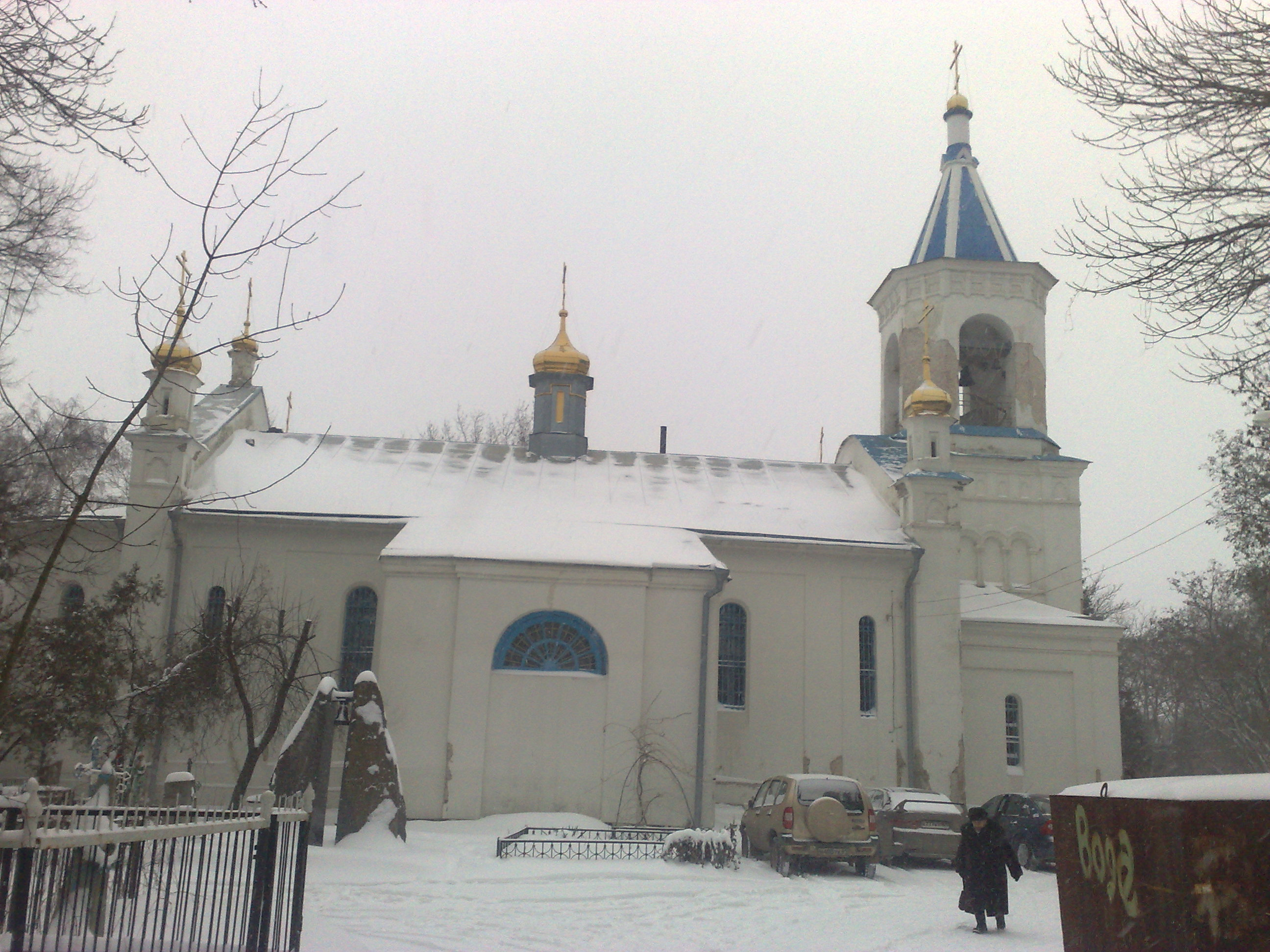
- St. Dimitry's Church

Religion
- Affiliation: Russian Orthodox

Location
- Location: Novocherkassk, Russia
- Interactive map of St. Dimitry's Church

Architecture
- Architect: Valprede I. O.
- Completed: 1859

Saint Dimitry's Church (Russian: Свя́то-Дими́триевский храм) is a Russian Orthodox church in Novocherkassk dedicated to Demetrius of Thessaloniki. It is located at the town cemetery, and thus sometimes called the Cemetery Church of St. Dimitry.

== History ==
In the fall of 1810, a wooden Church of St. Demetrius was consecrated on the grounds of the town cemetery. This wooden church existed until 1861. At the initiative of the Don Cossack Ataman Chomutov and Archbishop of Don and Novocherkassk John, construction began in 1857 on a stone church to replace the wooden one. Construction was funded by Don Cossacks and various merchants, and was completed in 1859. The designer of the project was the famous architect Ivan Valprede.

In 1901 a parish school was opened at the church, and it still continues to function. There was also once a chapel dedicated to the memory of Cossacks who died in First World War.

At the cemetery were buried the first elected Ataman of the Don Cossacks since the time of Peter I, Alexey Kaledin (his grave has not been preserved); Don historian V. Sukhorukov; the Ataman's son M.G Chomutov, and many others. Among the remaining graves, although looted or destroyed, are those of General Hreschatitsky, General Lyutenskov, and others.

After the establishment of Soviet regime in Novocherkassk in 1920, the church was not closed, and continued to be in service. In 1999, the church was sanctified and there were arranged six new bells, and the structure was renovated overall.
