= Palace of Ceremonies (Novocherkassk) =

Building of Don Soviet Republic, Russia

- Дворец торжественных обрядов (Russian)
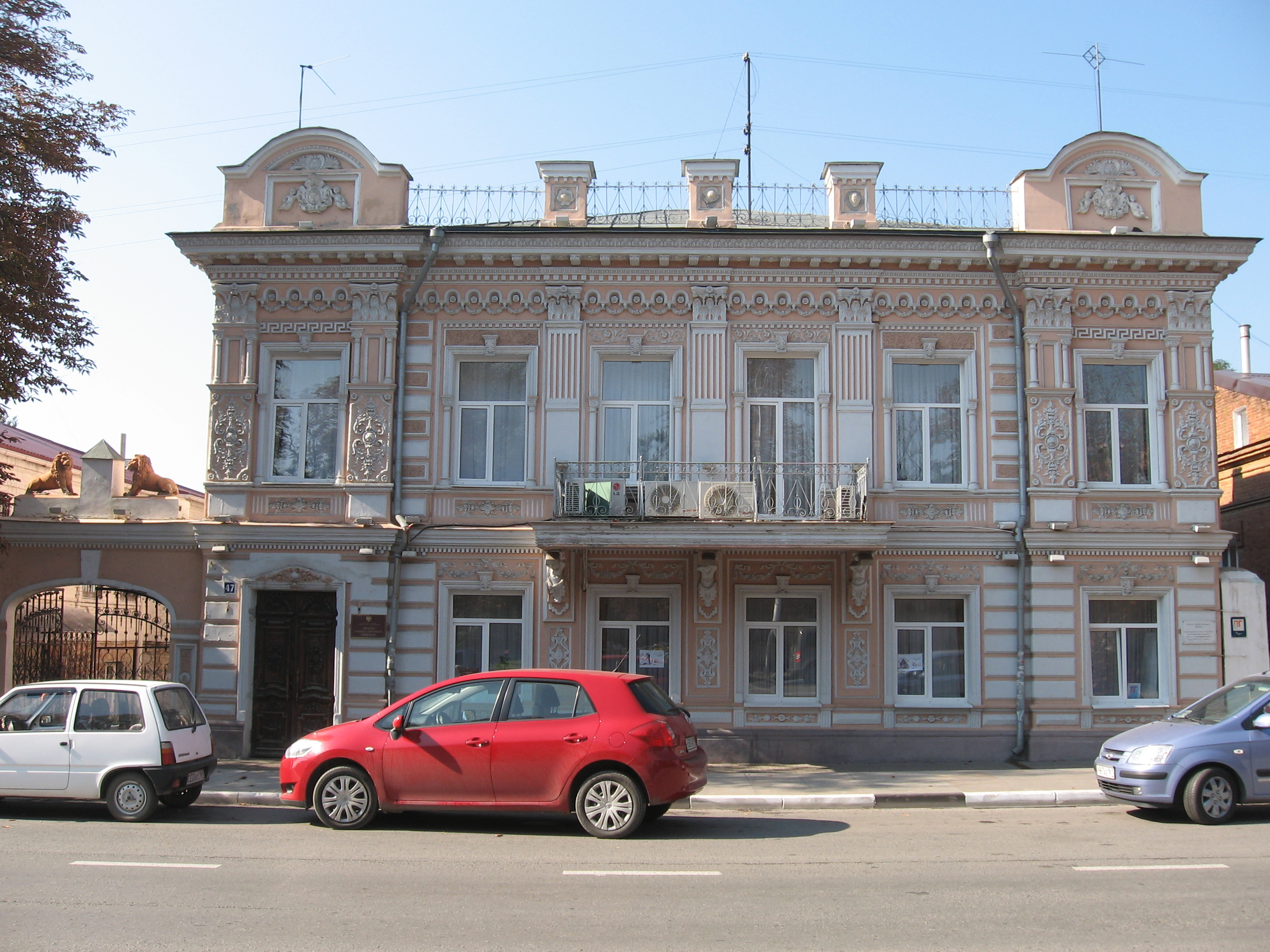
- Palace of Ceremonies

- Location within Russia
- Type: Building
- Location: Novocherkassk, Rostov oblast Russia

Palace of Ceremonies (Russian: Дворец торжественных обрядов; before 1964 - House of Happiness) is a two-storey mansion, located in Novocherkassk, on Moskovskaya street, 47.

== Description ==
This private mansion was built in the third quarter of the nineteenth century and belonged to merchant Kiryunin. There are many stucco decorations on the facade of the building. The elements of baroque, Renaissance, classicism and Moorish architecture makes exterior of the building The arch of the gates with two sculptures of lions on its top is on the left from the central entry. There is a version that the building used to be a brothel. This theory was confirmed by H. A. Semenihin in his novel "Novocherkassk". Obviously, this is the main reason why the building has two wheel barriers on both sides of the gates - the elements of phallic art. Arriving officers used to tie their horses to them.

The building is in quite a good state of reservation. The partial reconstruction was made in 1990. Although the name of "The House of Happiness" has been out of use in official documents since 1964, it had been used up to the time of reconstruction. Nowadays the palace is used as a Civil Registry Office.
