= St. George's Church, Novocherkassk =

Russian Orthodox church in Novocherkassk, Rostov Oblast, Russia

Coordinates: 47.4223°N 40.1068°E

St. George's Church
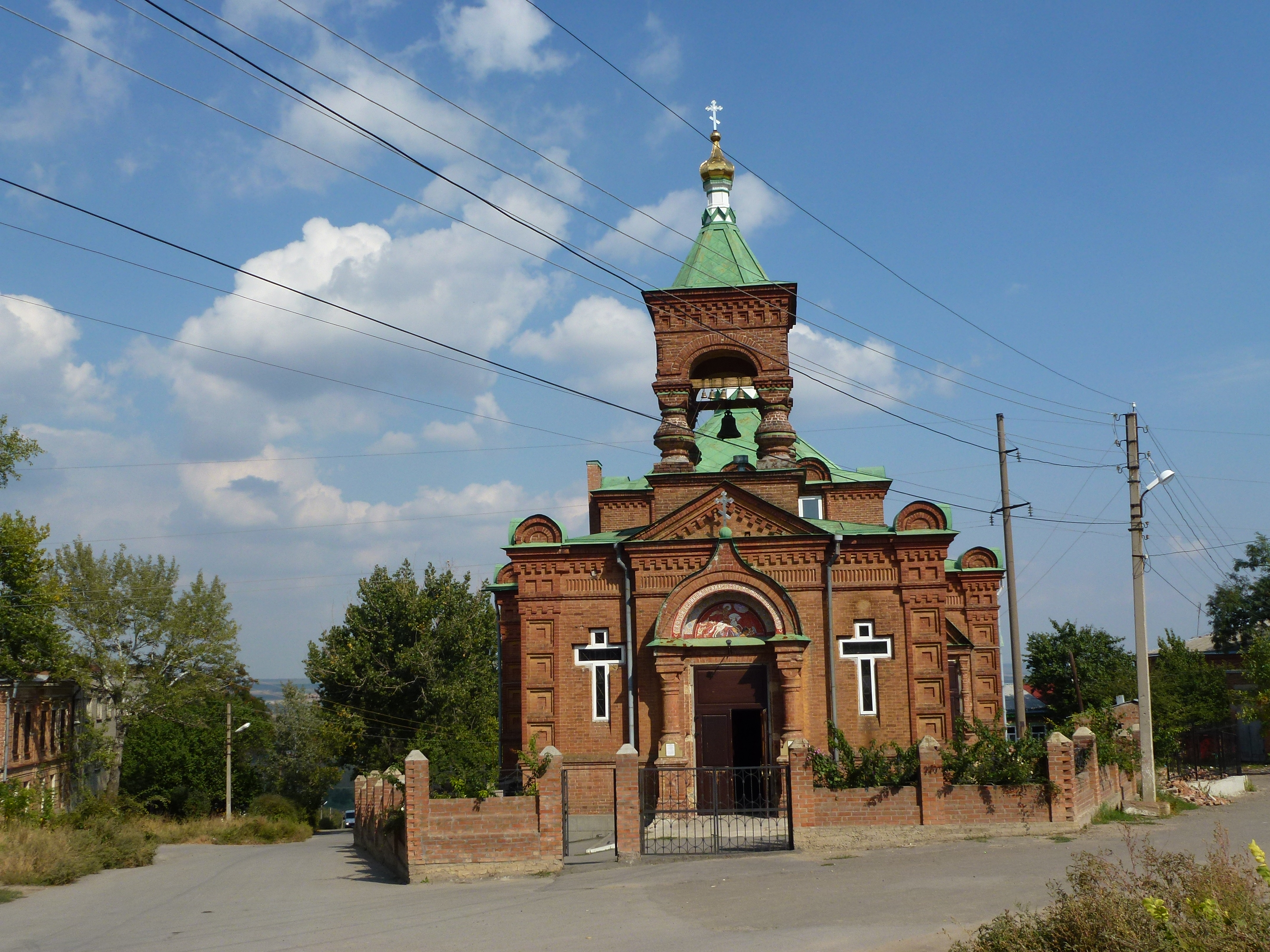

Religion
- Affiliation: Russian Orthodox

Location
- Location: Novocherkassk, Russia
- Interactive map of St. George's Church

Architecture
- Architect: Kulikov N. V.
- Completed: 1898

Saint George's Church (Russian: Свято-Георгиевская церковь) — an Orthodox church in Novocherkassk, Russia. The church was built to commemorate the rescue of Alexander III and his family from Borki train disaster which happened on 17 October 1888. It is situated in Pervomaisky district of Novocherkassk. Full official name ― Church of the Holy Great Martyr George the Victorious. Considered to be a monument of cultural heritage in Russia.

== History ==
In 1890 a parish curatorship on church building was formed, headed by court counselor Ivan Kievsky. Architect V. N. Kulikov drafted the project, which was based on Edinoverian church in the village of Nižnij Čir. St. George's Church as built on a bank of Tuzlov river. It is an example of a rather peculiar architecture of Russian style. Instead of a high bell tower above the refectory there is a small bell-gable. The church is rather small, it has a capacity of 400 people.

The church was built on private donations solely. Iconostasis was made in A. Soloviev's workshop in Novocherkassk. All ware were donated by different philanthropists. The following inscription was carved on one of the altar crosses:

«The construction of St. George's church began on 27th of April, 1897, it was consecrated on 18th of October, 1898. The construction process took 1 year, 5 months and 21 days»

.

The first rector of St. George's Church was Archpriest Alexander Popov, who became the abbot of the temple in 1898, when he was still quite a young priest, and has been in this obedience until 1906. Sonn after he was granted the title of Archpriest, he went to continue his service as rector in Holy Protection Church in Krivyanskaya village.

The parish school was established in 1899, and had been situated in rented quarters for 8 years. In 1908 there was finally built its own school building next to the church.

The church continued to function until 1939, when the Presidium of the Regional Executive Committee expropriated it from the community of believers, appealing to the decision of the Central Executive Committee of 1929. In the same year the church was closed. In post-war years it was used as a granary storage. At the end of the 1940s the church was returned to the faithful and became active again.

The restoration of the building began in 1990. The church still keeps preserved relics that has been there since the time of construction: Icon of the Holy Prince Alexander Nevsky in a silver frame and Icon of Saint Panteleimon the Healer, written by the monks of Athos. Of particular interest there is also a miniature wall iconostasis of academic school painting style, and a copy of «The Last Supper», the famous fresco by Leonardo da Vinci. In October 2000, St. George's Church acquired a new shrine ― the icon «It is Truly Meet» from the list of myrrh-streaming icons of Mount Athos.
