= Platov family =

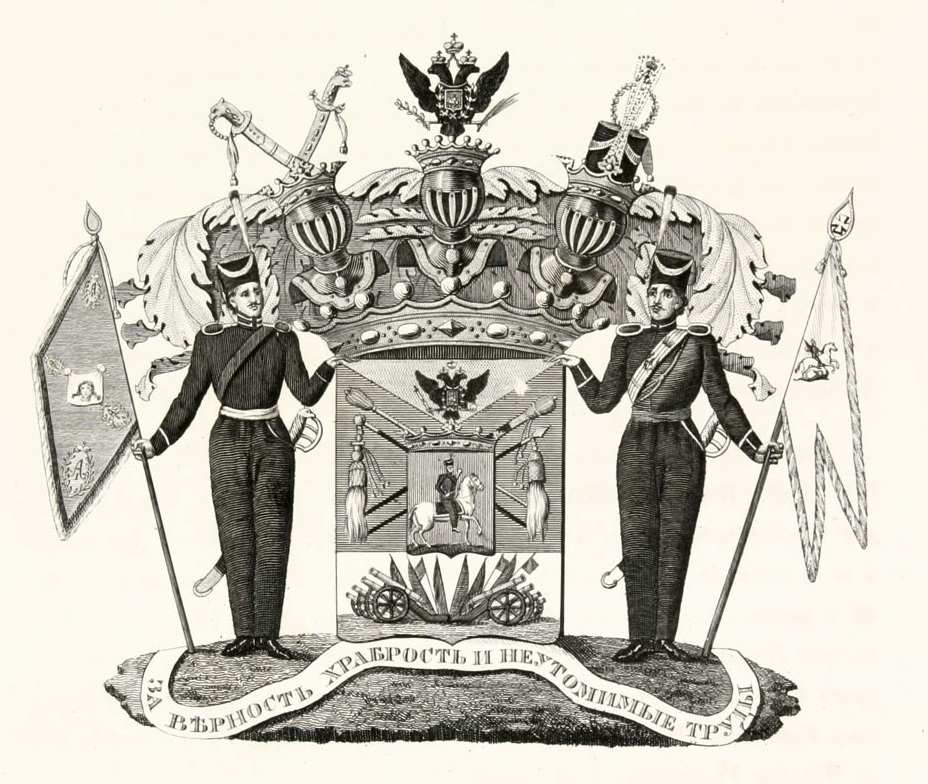
Coat of arms

The Platov family (Russian: Платов) was the name of a Russian noble family of Greek descent. The family's name is a Russification of the Greek name "Platon" (Greek: Πλάτων).

== Notable members ==
- Matvei Platov (1751–1818), was born in Starocherkassk. Was a general who commanded the Don Cossacks in the Napoleonic Wars, upon Alexander I's accession to the throne, he was appointed Ataman of the Don Cossacks. In 1805, he ordered the Cossack capital to be moved from Starocherkassk to a new location, known as Novocherkassk. Count of the Russian Empire in 1812. Platov later accompanied emperor Alexander to London where he was awarded a golden sword.
- Ivan Platov II (1796-1874). Youngest of Matvei Platovs sons. Colonel of Don Cossacks in Napoleonic Wars.
