= Lutheran Church, Novocherkassk =

Church of Evangelical Christians-Baptists
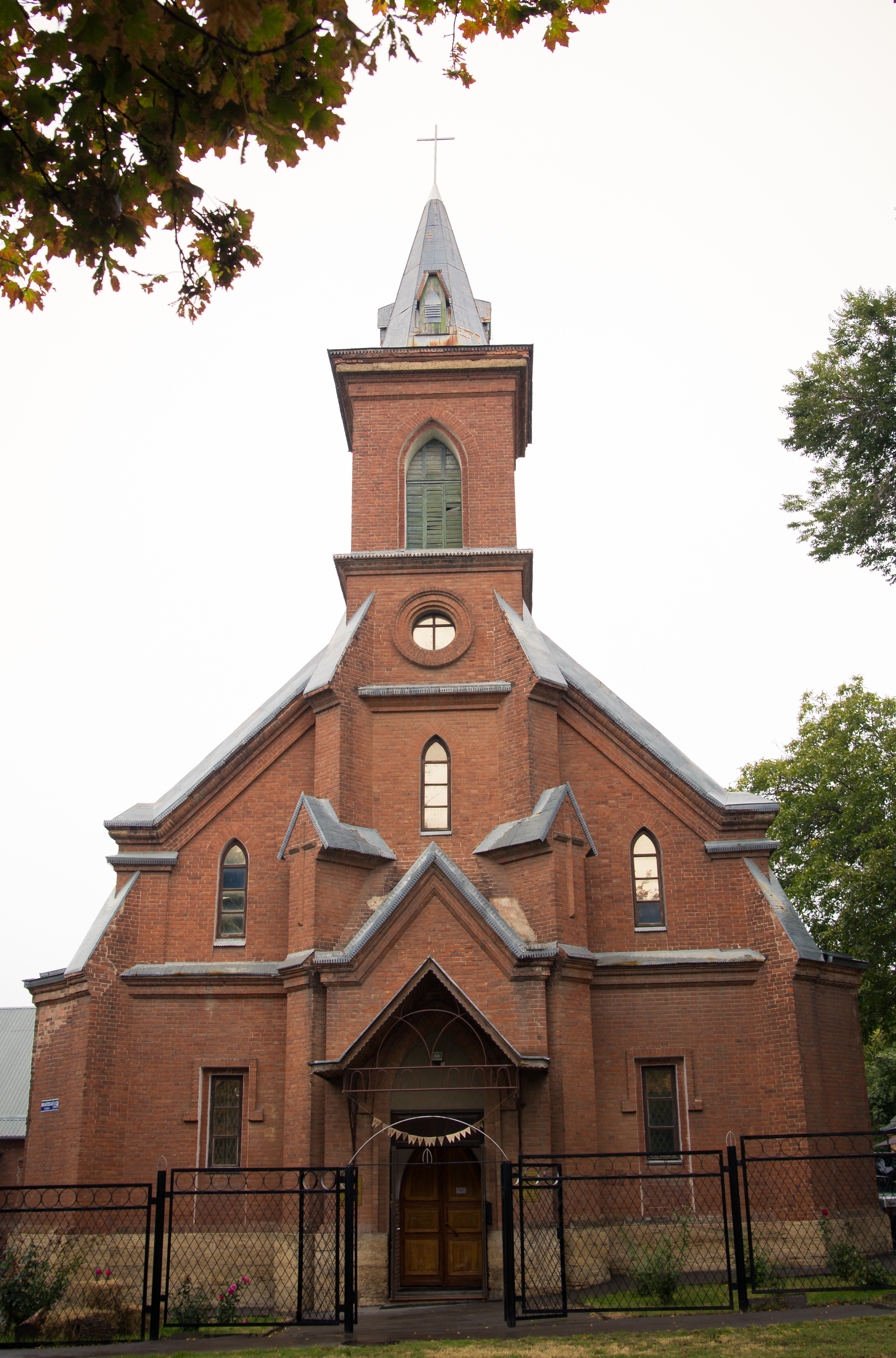

Religion
- Affiliation: Baptist

Location
- Location: Novocherkassk, Rostov Oblast, Russia
- Interactive map of Church of Evangelical Christians-Baptists

Architecture
- Architect: Nikolay Roller
- Completed: 1898

Church of Evangelical Christians-Baptists (Russian: Церковь Евангельских Христиан-Баптистов) (also widely known as Lutheran Church in Novocherkassk, Russian: Лютеранская кирха в Новочеркасске) ― the largest Protestant (Baptist) church in the city of Novocherkassk, Rostov Oblast, Russia. It was built in 1898 on the project of architect N.I. Roller. The church is considered to be an architectural monument of cultural heritage of regional importance.

== History ==
In Novocherkassk, just as well as in the entire European part of Russia, since the 18th century had been living many Germans who were invited to settle there. All of them were engaged in various crafts: many were doctors, others were architects, merchants, officers. Most of them were Protestants, and this caused some difficulties for them: in many places, they simply had no place for worship. At the end of the 19th century, in order to solve this problem in Novocherkassk, the local authorities decided to designate a piece of land in the city for the construction of a Lutheran church. The church was constructed in 1898 on the project of architect Nikolai Ivanovich Roller in Neo-Gothic style, which was typical for Germany. The building has one belltower. The facade of the church resembles the traditional features of Medieval architecture.

Before the October Revolution, the church had not only been a place of worship: it was also an important cultural center of the city. The building was often used as a concert hall.

In 1930 the church was closed on the order of Soviet authorities. During the Second World War, when Novocherkassk was occupied by the Wehrmacht, it was opened. After the war the church was again closed and it was used as a warehouse. In the 1970s, the building was completely abandoned and littered. In 1990 the church building was handed over to the community of Evangelical Christians—Baptists, although in the past it had belonged to the Lutheran community. In 1992 the building was listed in the register of cultural values of the Rostov region. In 1994 it also was renovated at the expense of the Baptist congregation and has been active since then.
