= Tanais (cinema) =

- Танаис (кинотеатр) (Russian)
- Location within Russia
- Location: Novocherkassk, Rostov oblast Russia

History
- Built: 1903

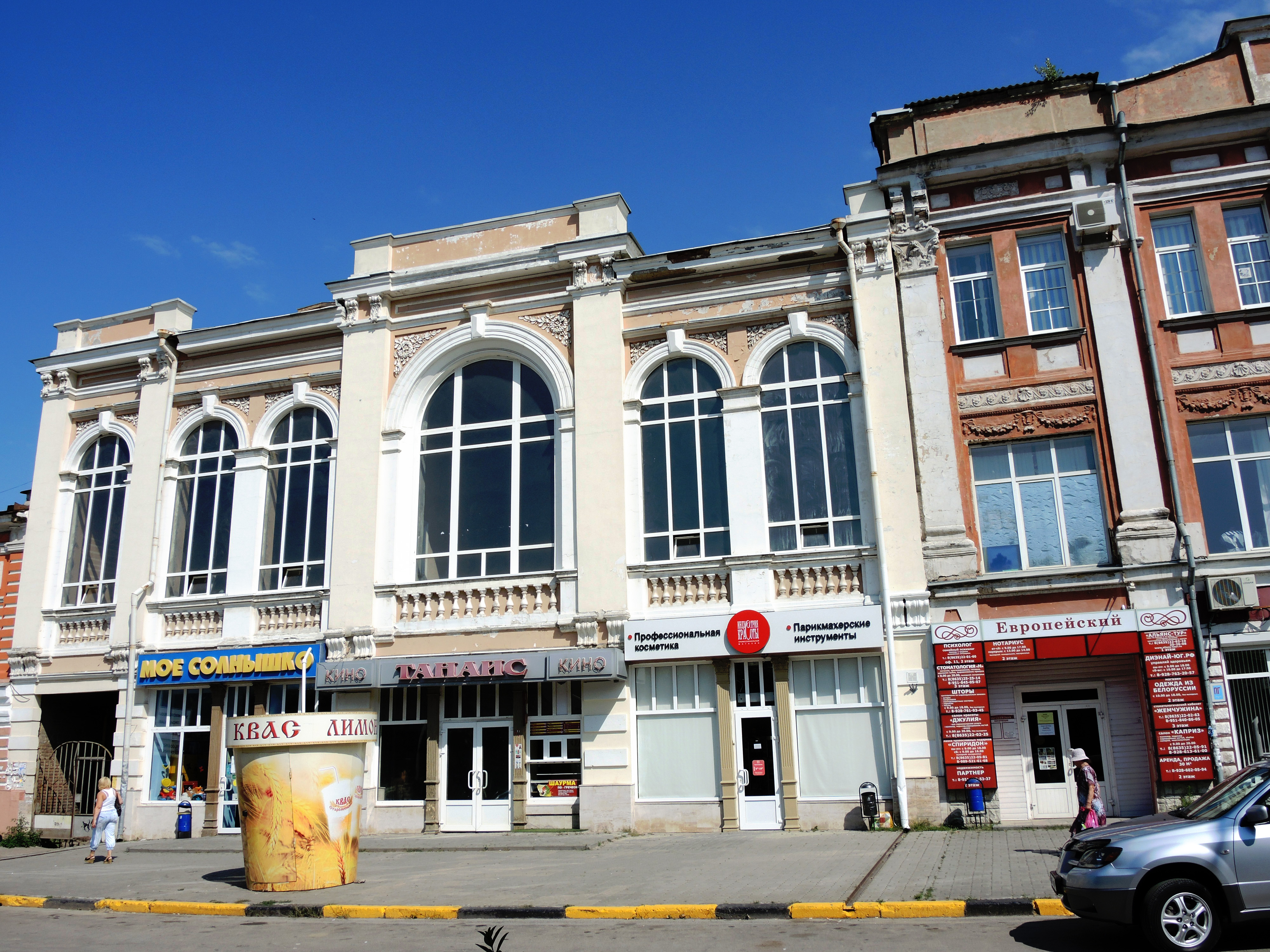

Tanais (Russian: Кинотеатр Танаис) is a cinema located in Novocherkassk, Rostov Region. The oldest cinema in the city. It is a monument of local architecture.

== History ==
In 1903 in Novocherkassk on Platovsky Avenue of Golokolosova in Kondratova's house was opened a cinema "Pathé". It was equipped with equipment brought from Paris by the French company "F. and E. Pathé ", in honor of it was originally called a cinema.

In the summer and autumn of 1914 the military theme was popular in the cinema. The following announcements were often met in the local press: in the electro-biographer Pathé there is a picture "Struggle against the demon" "with the participation of the famous kino-artist V. Harrison" or "Pathe" successfully competes in Novocherkassk, showing "great historical pictures like" Spartacus, the leader of the gladiators "and" Cleopatra and Antony ".

Initially, the building had a balcony.

In the 2000s, the building was under repair, and in early 2010 was put up for sale.

== Links ==
Кинотеатр «Танаис»
