= Trinity Church (Novocherkassk) =

Church in Rostov Oblast, Russia

- Троицкая церковь
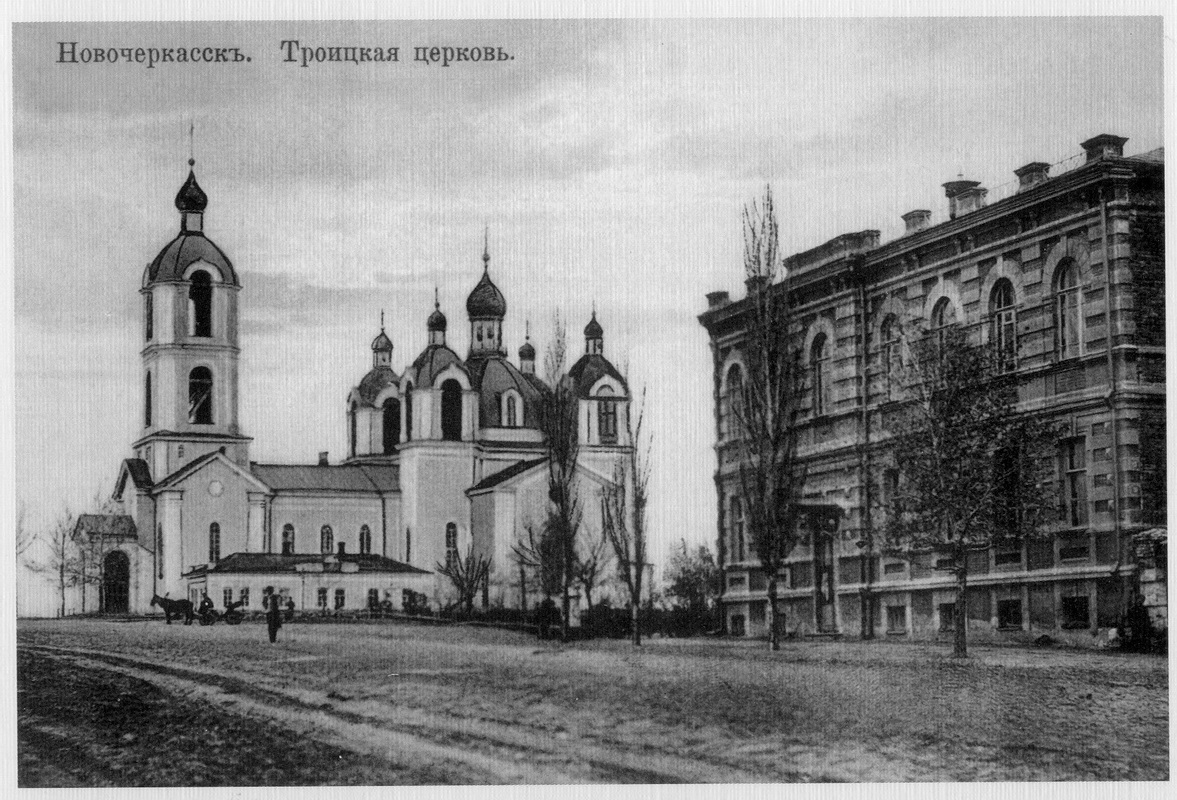
- The Trinity Church pictured on a postcard, the beginning of the 20th century
- Trinity Church
- Location: Novocherkassk, Rostov Oblast, Russia
- Country: Russia
- Denomination: Russian Orthodox Church

History
- Status: Parish church
- Dedication: Holy Trinity

Architecture
- Functional status: Destroyed
- Completed: 1856

The Trinity Church (Russian: Троицкая церковь or Церковь Троицы Живоначальной) was a Russian Orthodox church in Novocherkassk, Rostov Oblast, Russia.

== History ==
The first wooden Trinity church was constructed on Troitskaya (Trinity) square in 1810. After some decades passed, in 1830, the church fence collapsed.

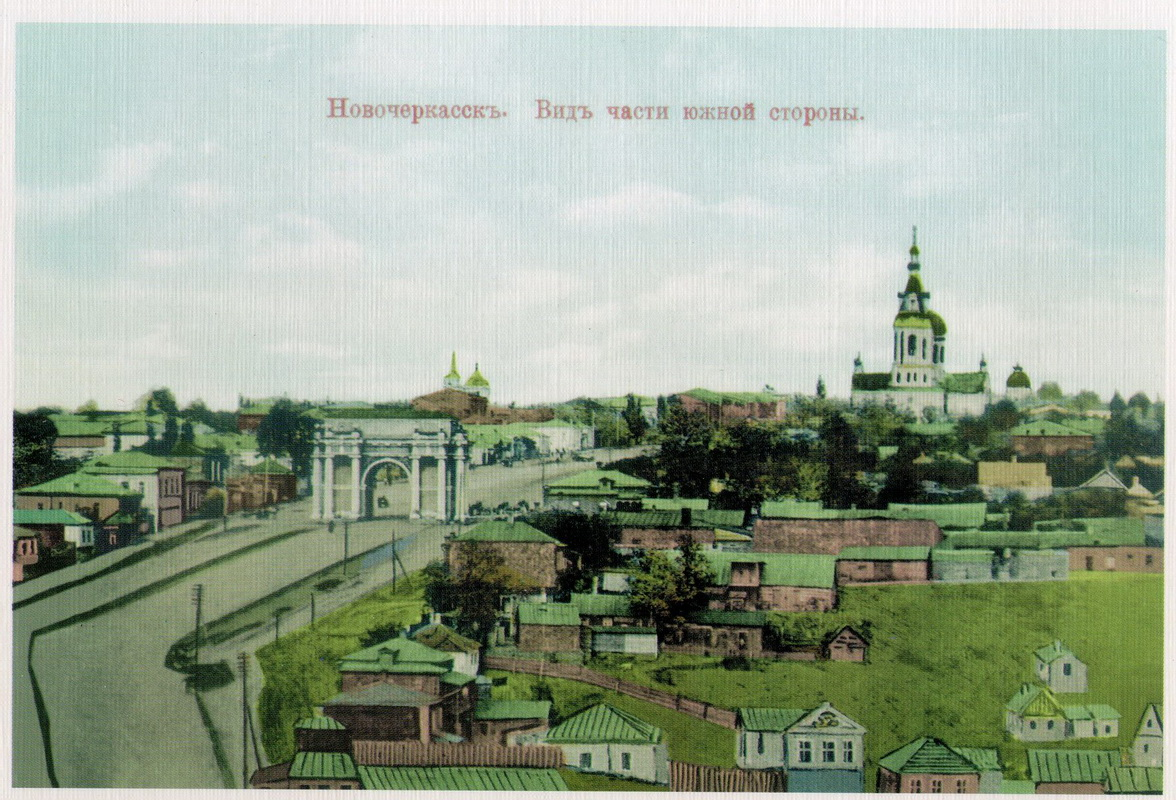
View of Novocherkassk from its southern side. The Trinity church can also been seen here.

In 1835, parishioners began to appeal to church authorities about the need to build a stone church. Architect Fomin, who compiled a project of a tripartite, five-domed, Byzantine-style church was asked to draft an appropriate project, which was later finished and approved on August 2, 1845.

Only five years later, on June 24, 1850, with the blessing of the Archbishop of Don and Novocherkassk, Ioann Dobrozrakov, a solemn laying of the stone church was done. In 1856 the church was completed. Icons for iconostasis were painted by local artists Ardalion Zolotarev and Mikhail Golmov. The consecration of the Trinity Church took place on May 30, 1859.

As of 1915, the Novocherkassk Trinity Church was five-domed, had a stone bell tower, and consisted of two floors. The main dome had a conical shape with eight windows. The crosses on the chapels of the church were made of iron, but were also gilded. In the lower tier of bell tower there were ten bells. The refectory of the Trinity Church was very spacious - 12 meters long, 8.5 meters wide and 9.6 meters high. At the entrance to the church on the right and left sides were the choirs.

The Trinity Church was closed in the mid-1930s during a massive anti-religious campaign. Shortly after it was destroyed.
