= Sts. Constantine and Helen Church, Novocherkassk =

Coordinates: 47.427652°N 40.082867°E

Sts. Constantine and Helen Church
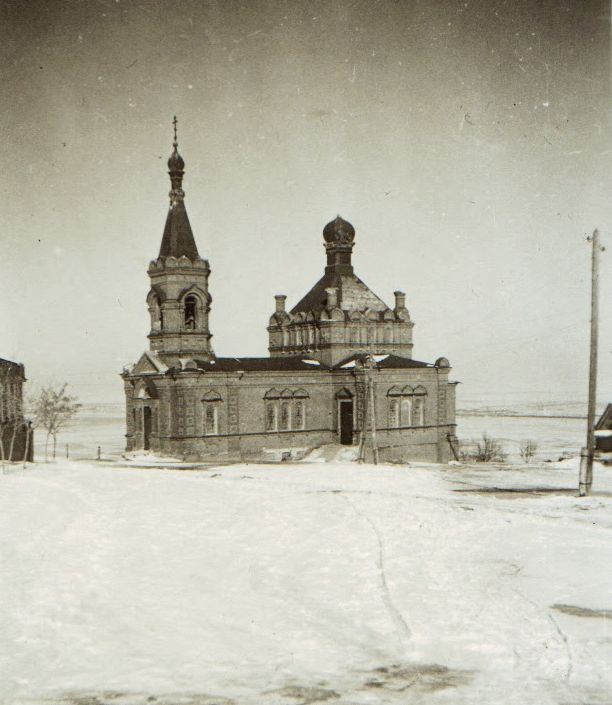
- The church in 1942

Religion
- Affiliation: Russian Orthodox

Location
- Location: Novocherkassk, Rostov Oblast, Russia
- Interactive map of Sts. Constantine and Helen Church

Architecture
- Architect: V.N.Kulikov
- Style: Neoclassicism
- Completed: 1909

Saints Constantine and Helen Church is a Russian Orthodox church in the city of Novocherkassk, Rostov Oblast, Russia. It belongs to the Novocherkassk Diocese of the Moscow Patriarchate.

== History ==
Sts. Constantine and Helen Church was built in Novocherkassk in 1864 in order to replace an old wooden chapel. This new church was also built of wood.

After several years it also decayed and parishioners organized collection of donations. The construction site for the new Constantine and Helen Church was consecrated on March 5, 1906. The construction cost about 15 thousand rubles.

Sts. Constantine and Helen church was consecrated on May 10, 1909 by archpriest Vasily Petrov.

The temple has three altars: the central one is dedicated to the Holy Spirit, the left one ― in the name of Saint Constantine and his mother Helen, and the right one ― in the name of Saint Nicholas.

In the 1930s the church was closed, but it has been operating again since the 1970s. In the late 1990s the church building was repaired and the crosses were gilded.

Two professional church choirs perform at the church today. There is also a Sunday school, and an art studio. Various performances, charity fairs, concerts are held there as well.
