= Monument to Yakov Baklanov =

- Russian: Памятник Якову Бакланову
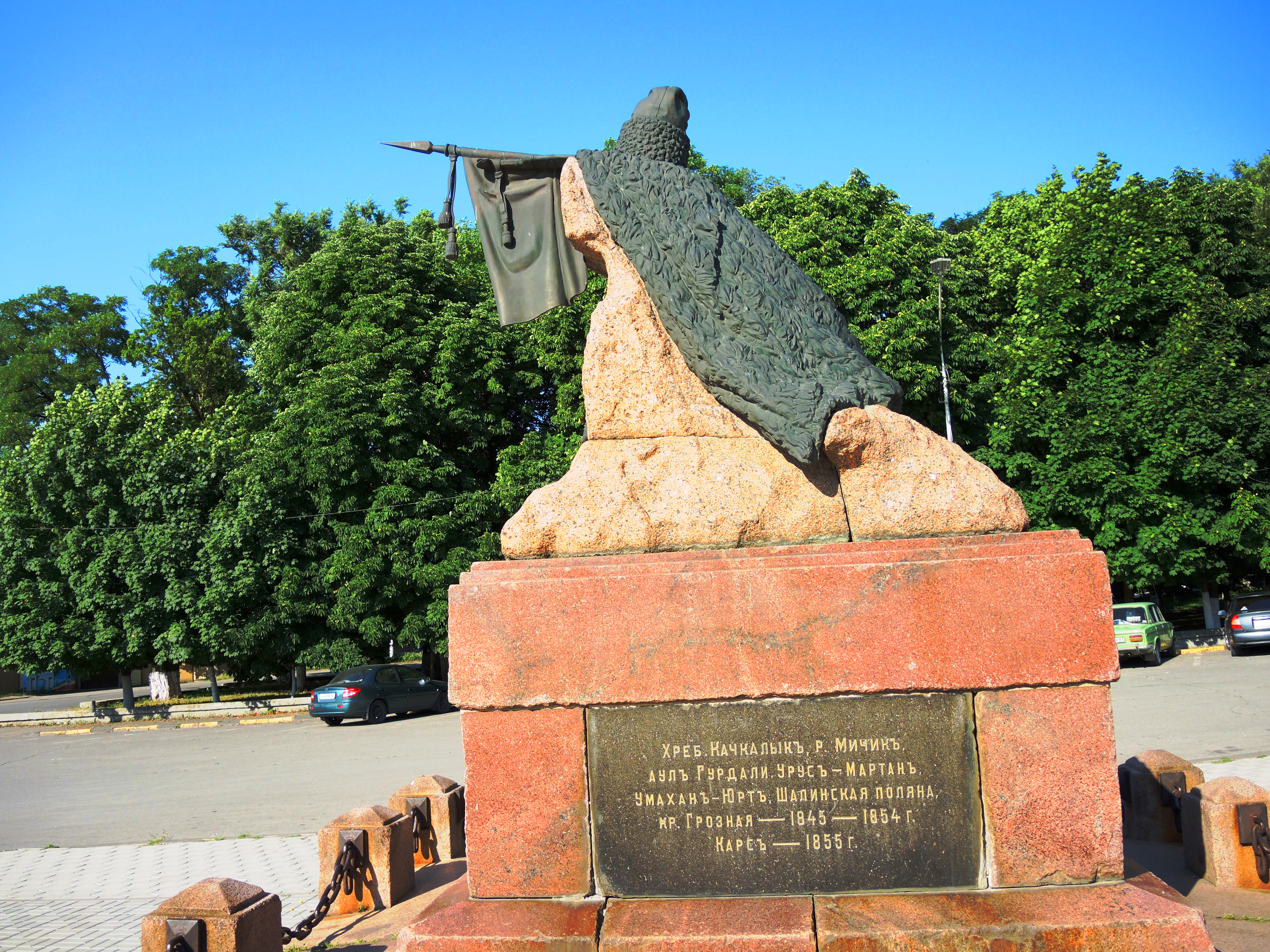
- Current state (2015)
- Interactive map of Monument to Yakov Baklanov
- Location: Yermaka square in Novocherkassk, Russia
- Coordinates: 47°24′47″N 40°06′39″E
- Designer: N. Nabokov
- Type: Monument
- Material: Bronze, granite
- Opening date: 1911

Monument to Yakov Baklanov (Russian: Памятник Якову Бакланову) is a bronze monument to participant in the Caucasian War, General Yakov Baklanov. It was originally located in Saint Petersburg at the cemetery in Smolny Convent above the grave of the commander. It was built from private donations. In 1909 during the celebration of the 100th anniversary of the birth of Yakov Baklanov it was decided that transferral of the burial in Novocherkassk was necessary. The bones along with the monument were transferred in Novocherkassk in 1911. Baklanov's coffin was placed into a shrine under Novocherkassk Cathedral. The sculpture composition with some adjustments in the pedestal was moulded on Yermaka square. The monument is located to the south of the Novocherkassk Cathedral. The opening ceremony of the monument took place on October 5, 1911.

== History ==
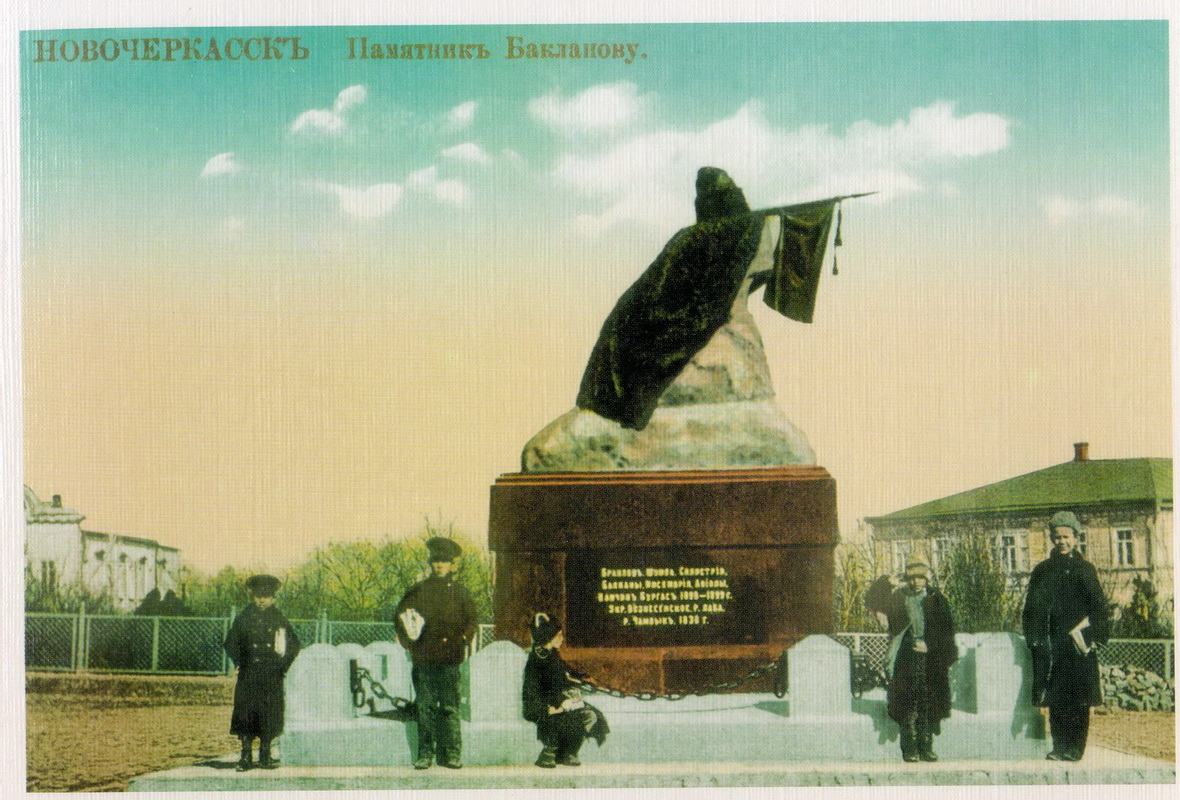
Monument to Yakov Baklanov on a pre-revolutionary postcard

After Baklanov's death in 1873 military ataman Mikheil Chertkov requested to start a whip-round for the monument. By the beginning of 1875 2314.02 rubles was raised. A miniature of the monument was designed by N. Nabokov. It was demonstrated at the House of Nobility in Novocherkassk. Variant proposed by sculptor Dyleev had satisfied no one. Don superior commissioned leading Petersburg masters to realize the approved draft. Master Yefimov processed the granite monolith boulder and decorated the burial vault. The casting of the statue was being supervised by the famous French bronze designer Félix Chopin.

The iron cannons provided by the draft were replaced by granitical spheres owing to lack of money. In 1911 the monument was entirely transferred in Novocherkassk. The gilding and bronze elements were dismantled and passed to scrap metal in 1930s. Restoration of the monument under the leadership of A. Tarasenko was completed on June 4, 1995, the year of the 195 years anniversary of Novocherkassk.

== Description ==
The monument is a granitical boulder, which is covered with a cossack burka and a battle standard with the last sentence of Nicene Creed «we look for the resurrection of the dead, and the life of the world to come. Amen.» (Russian: Чаю воскресения мёртвых и жизни будущего века. Аминь) written on it. A general's shashka is visible out from under the burka. The sculpture composition is crowned with a bronze papakha. The city's sites of military glory of Baklanov are carved on the sides of the pedestal. A bronze medallion with inscribed phrase: «Lieutenant General of the Don Host Oblast Yakov Petrovich Baklanov was born in 1809, died in October 18, 1873».
