= Focșani Military Chapel =

Church building in Focșani, Romania

Coordinates: 45°41′33″N 27°11′07″E

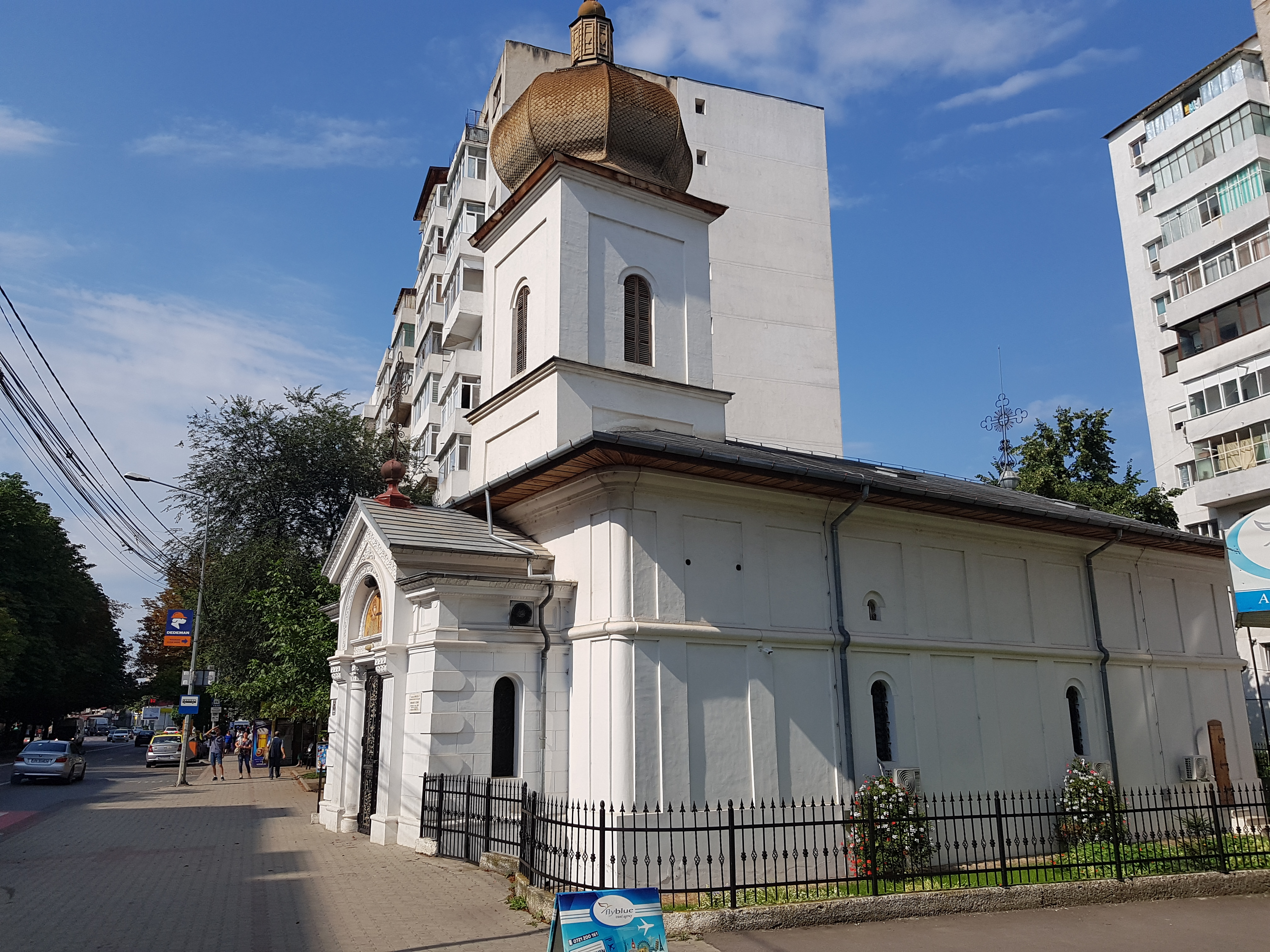
Focșani Military Chapel

The Focșani Military Chapel (Romanian: Capela Militară Focșani) is a Romanian Orthodox church located at 22 Unirii Boulevard in Focșani, Romania. Nowadays, it is a parish church dedicated to Saints Constantine and Helena.

The church is located in the Wallachian part of the city, on the site of a well ordered installed in 1696 by Prince Constantin Brâncoveanu. In 1810, Serdar Costache Robescu laid the cornerstone for what would become known as the Robescu Church, adjacent to his mansion. Despite the family’s patronage, it had become a ruin by the end of the 19th century. The 1838 Vrancea earthquake cracked the spire, while an 1854 fire damaged the church and the adjacent building which housed liturgical objects.

In 1893, the Robescu heir of the day donated the ruined church and annexes to the local military garrison, together with 6,000 lei for repairs. The War Ministry carried out a renovation, also using funds from donors and garrisoned troops. The building served as a military chapel from 1893 until 1948; shortly after a communist regime was established. The chapel suffered serious damage during the 1940 Vrancea earthquake. Repairs were carried out by soldiers between 1941 and 1943, in the midst of World War II; General Mihail Lascăr aided in the effort. The painting and decor were reconditioned under supervision by a military priest.

The carved wooden iconostasis dates to 1855; the icons date to that period, and to 1942-1943. In 1832, during the Regulamentul Organic period, the church welcomed Russian general Pavel Kiselyov with a liturgy. In 1917, the remains of Ecaterina Teodoroiu spent three days inside while being transported to her native Târgu Jiu.

The church is ship-shaped, with a porch, narthex, nave, and altar. The spire rises above the narthex. The building is recessed below street level by half a meter. The ktetors’ grave is in the narthex, covered by a marble tablet inscribed with their names and floral decorations. The facades are divided into repeating rectangular sections, separated by flat plaster columns. The entrance has a triangular pediment and plant motifs.

The church, dated 1815, and its 18th-century wall are listed as historic monuments by Romania's Ministry of Culture and Religious Affairs.
