= Church of Sts. Constantine and Helena (Skopje) =

- Црква „Св. Константин и Елена“
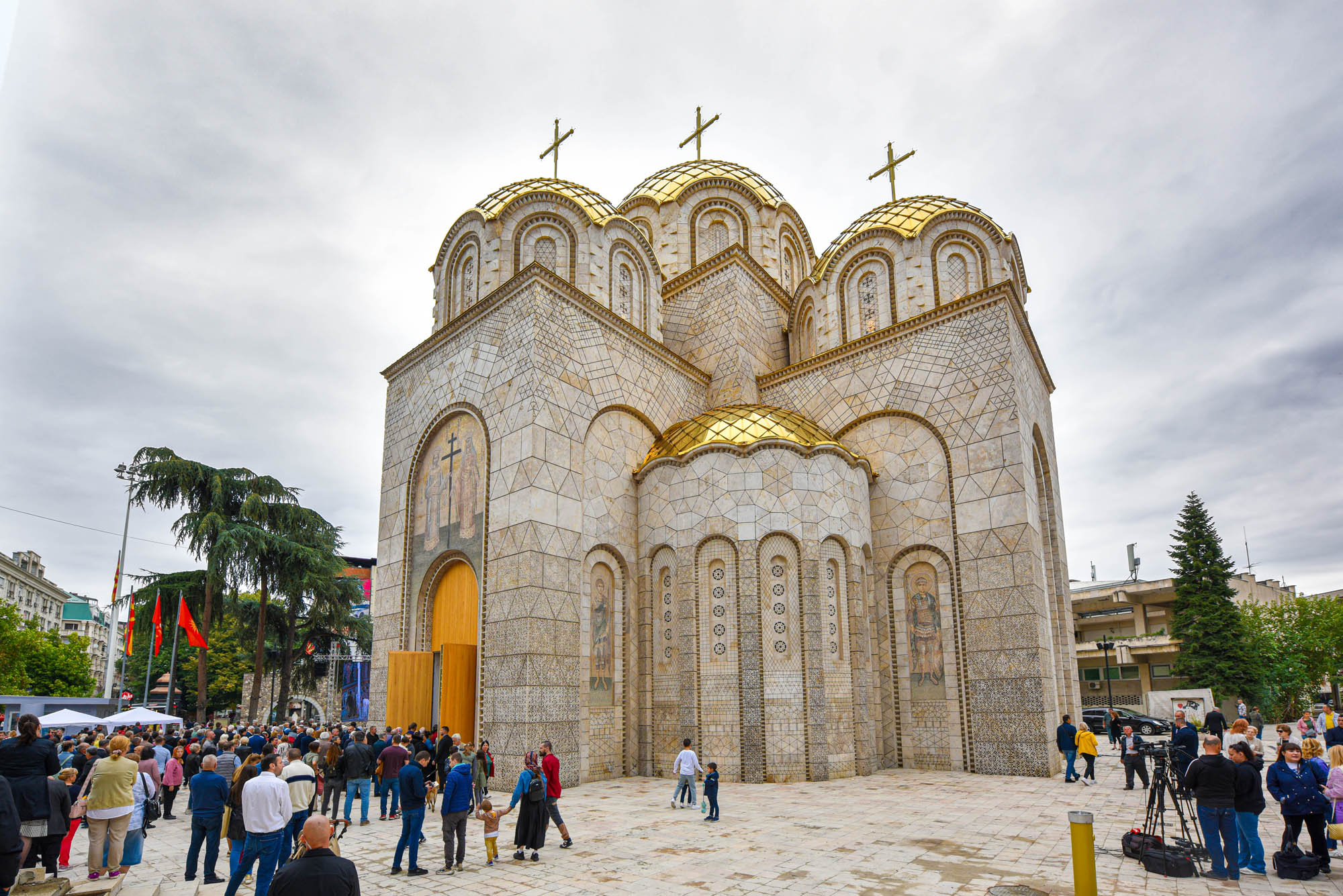
- Church of Sts. Constantine and Helena in Skopje
- Church of Sts. Constantine and Helena
- 41°59′36″N 21°25′51″E
- Location: Skopje, North Macedonia
- Denomination: Eastern Orthodox
- Religious institute: Macedonian Orthodox

History
- Status: Active
- Consecrated: 28 September 2025

Architecture
- Functional status: Parish church
- Style: Eastern Orthodox
- Completed: 2025

The Church of Sts. Constantine and Helena (Macedonian: Црква „Св. Константин и Елена“) is a Macedonian Orthodox church located on "Street Macedonia" in Skopje, North Macedonia. The church is a part of the project "Skopje 2014".

== History ==
The original church was built in 1927. It was heavily damaged during the 1963 Skopje earthquake and subsequently demolished to make way for the City Trade Centre. Construction efforts on a new church began in early 2010's sponsored by local businessman, church figures, and politicians. The construction started in November 2012 with prominent public figures present including former prime minister Nikola Gruevski. It is located on the main pedestrian street in Skopje "Street Macedonia" not far from the original location of the old church. The church raised 4 million euros in donations lasted 13 years in construction and was consecrated on 28 September 2025.

== Architecture and engineering ==
The interior of Church of St. Constantine and St Helena in Skopje, North Macedonia

The church follows traditional Eastern Orthodox architectural styles. The architecture project for the new church was made by Iskra Lekovska and Vladimir Lekovski from the Skopje studio "Lelelele". The church is designed in the form of a cross from aerial view, the facade is made of travertine a type of limestone, while the roof is gold painted.

The bell tower is 50 meters tall while the church is 30 meters.The bells themselves were cast at the famous Grassmayr foundry in Innsbruck, Austria. With their size, they represent one of the largest set of bells in the Balkans, where the largest bell weighs 8.5 tons. Before their installation on the tower, the bells were solemnly consecrated by Archbishop of Ohrid and Macedonia and of Justiniana Prima Stefan on 9 September 2015.

The mosaics are the work of Macedonian mosaicist and icon painter Dejan Kratevski. The frescoes are the work of Larisa Brondarenko while the iconostasis is the work of Malka Koneska, Vasko Uchkov, and Valentina Koneska.

== Opening ==
With a solemn liturgy and the presence of a large number of believers, the newly built church "St. Constantine and Elena" in the center of Skopje was consecrated on 28 September 2025. The act of consecration was led by the Archbishop of Ohrid and Macedonia Stefan.. During the opening political public figures were present including present Macedonian prime minister Hristijan Mickoski and ministers of office.

== Significance ==
The church serves as a place of worship for the local Orthodox Christian community and is considered an important cultural and religious landmark in Skopje. Currently it marks the second largest church in Skopje before the Archbishop Cathedral "St. Clement of Ohrid" in Skopje.
