= Church of Sts. Constantine and Helena (Plovdiv) =

Church in Plovdiv, Bulgaria

Coordinates: 42°8′58″N 24°45′10″E

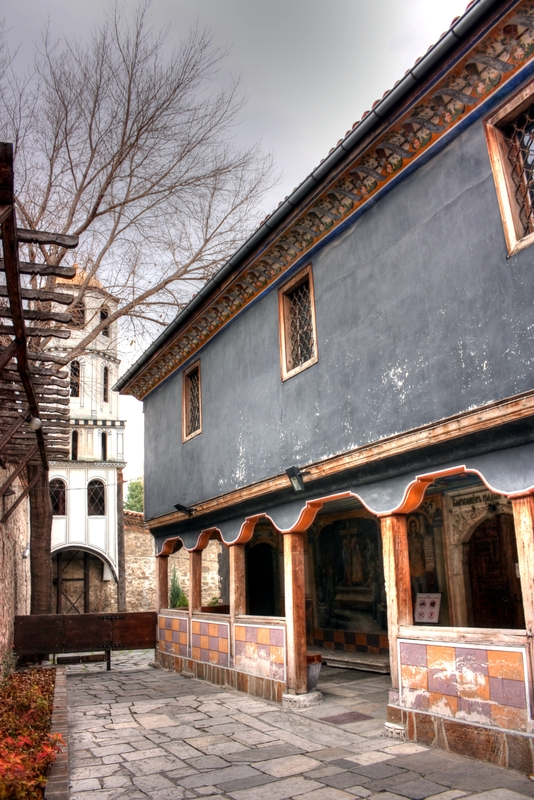
View of the church entrance

The Church of Saints Constantine and Helena (Bulgarian: Св. Св. Константин и Елена) is a church in Plovdiv, Bulgaria. It is considered to be among the oldest churches in the city.

It was built in 337 at the site of an ancient pagan temple in the acropolis on one of the fortified hills. The church was named after Emperor Constantine the Great and his mother Elena. During the years, the building was destroyed and rebuilt several times. Its current edifice was constructed in 1832 with the help of local patriots.

Its magnificent frescoes and icons were painted by masters from the renowned Debar Iconographic School. Some of the church's icons and paintings were created by the famous Bulgarian National Revival painter Zahari Zograf who worked in Plovdiv between 1836 and 1840.

== Gallery ==
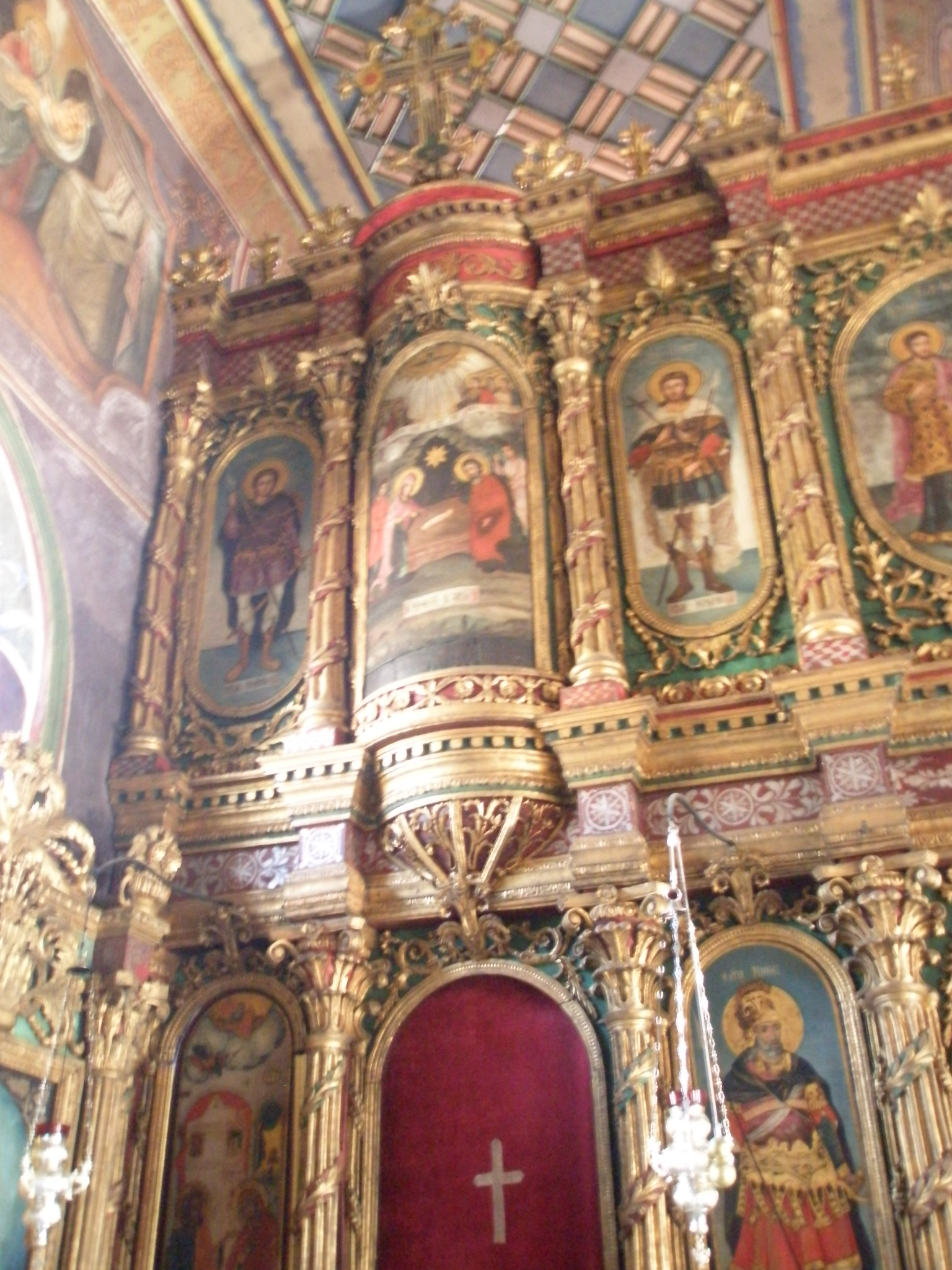
icons

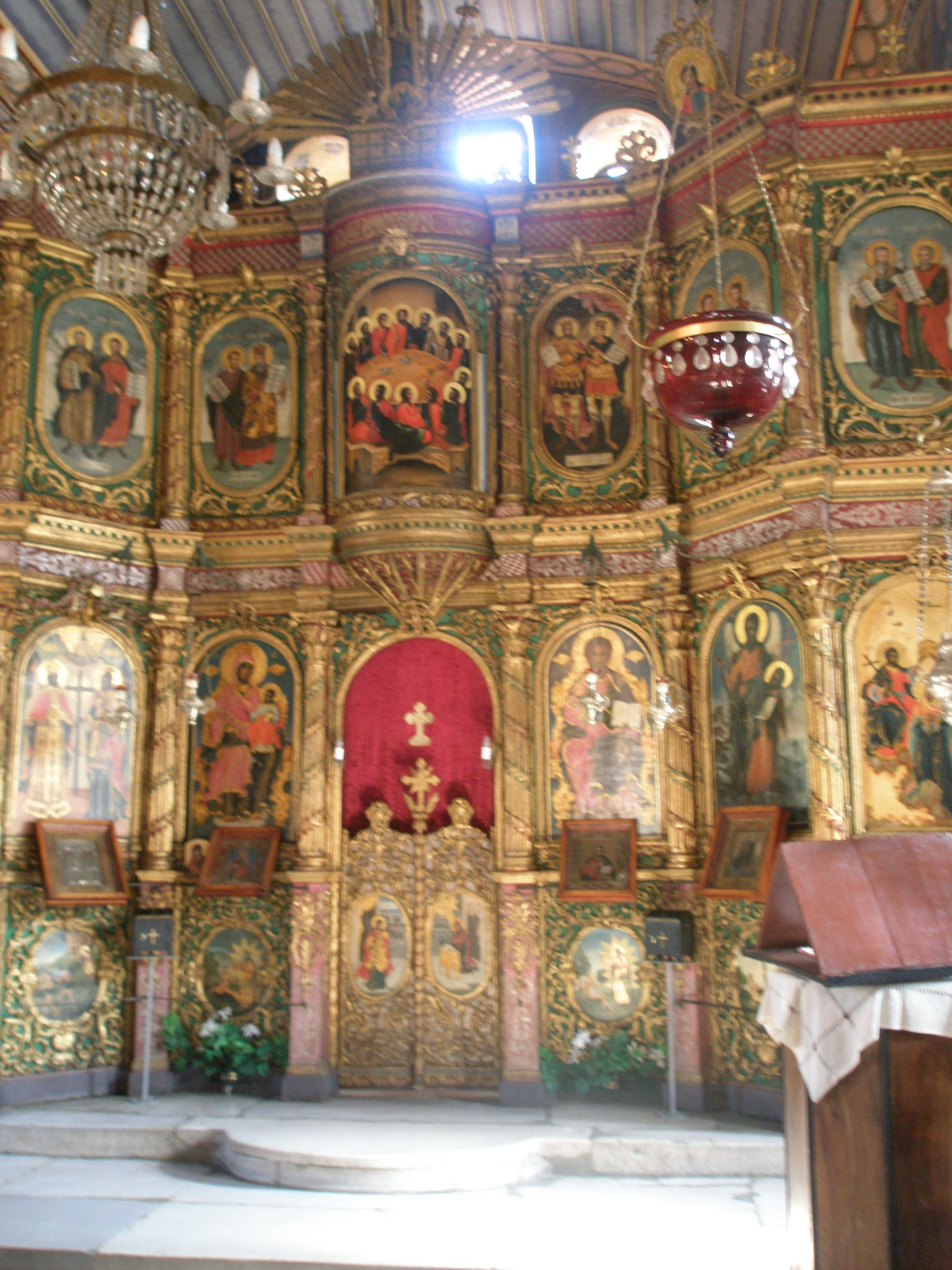
interior

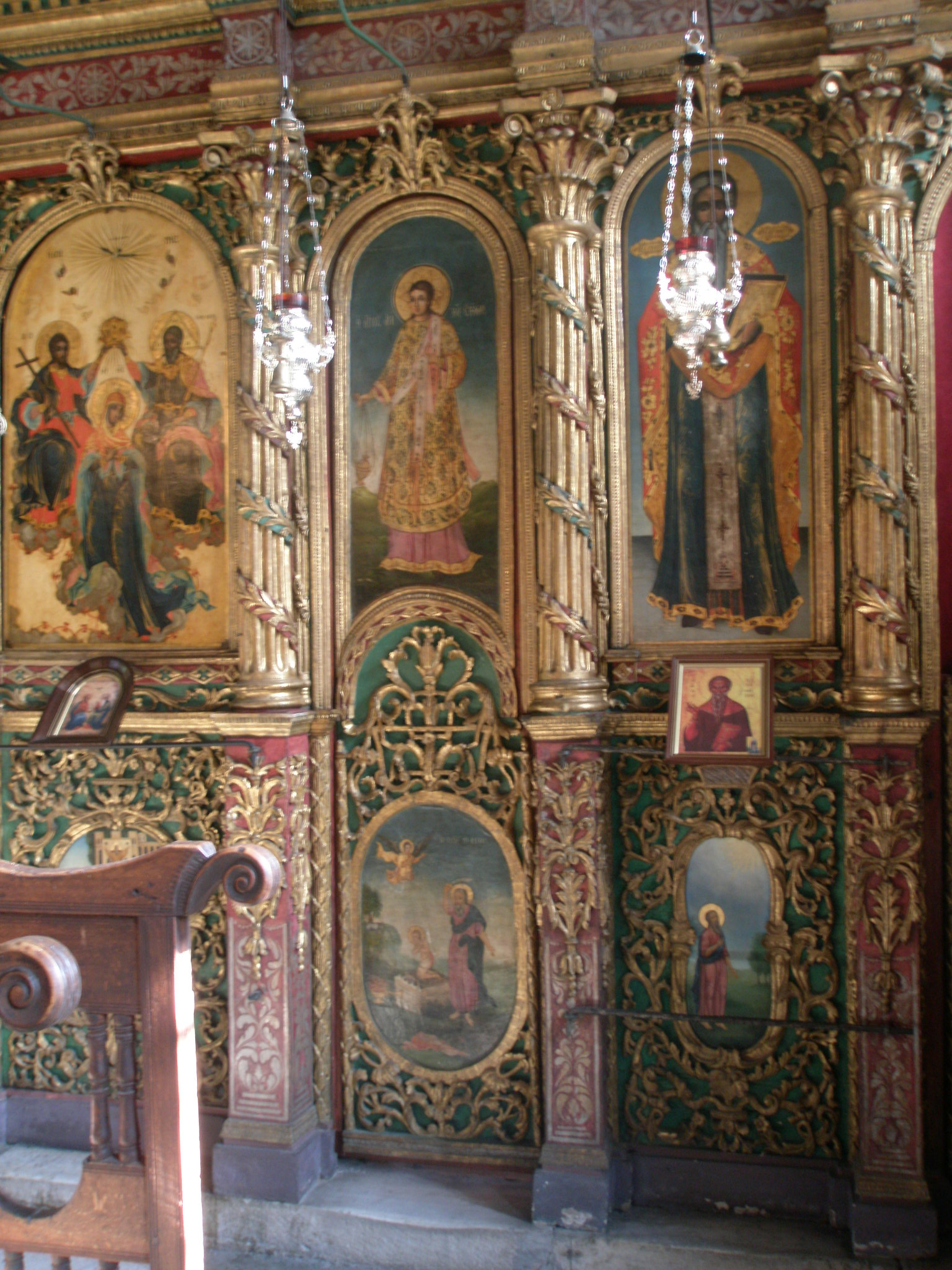
iconostas

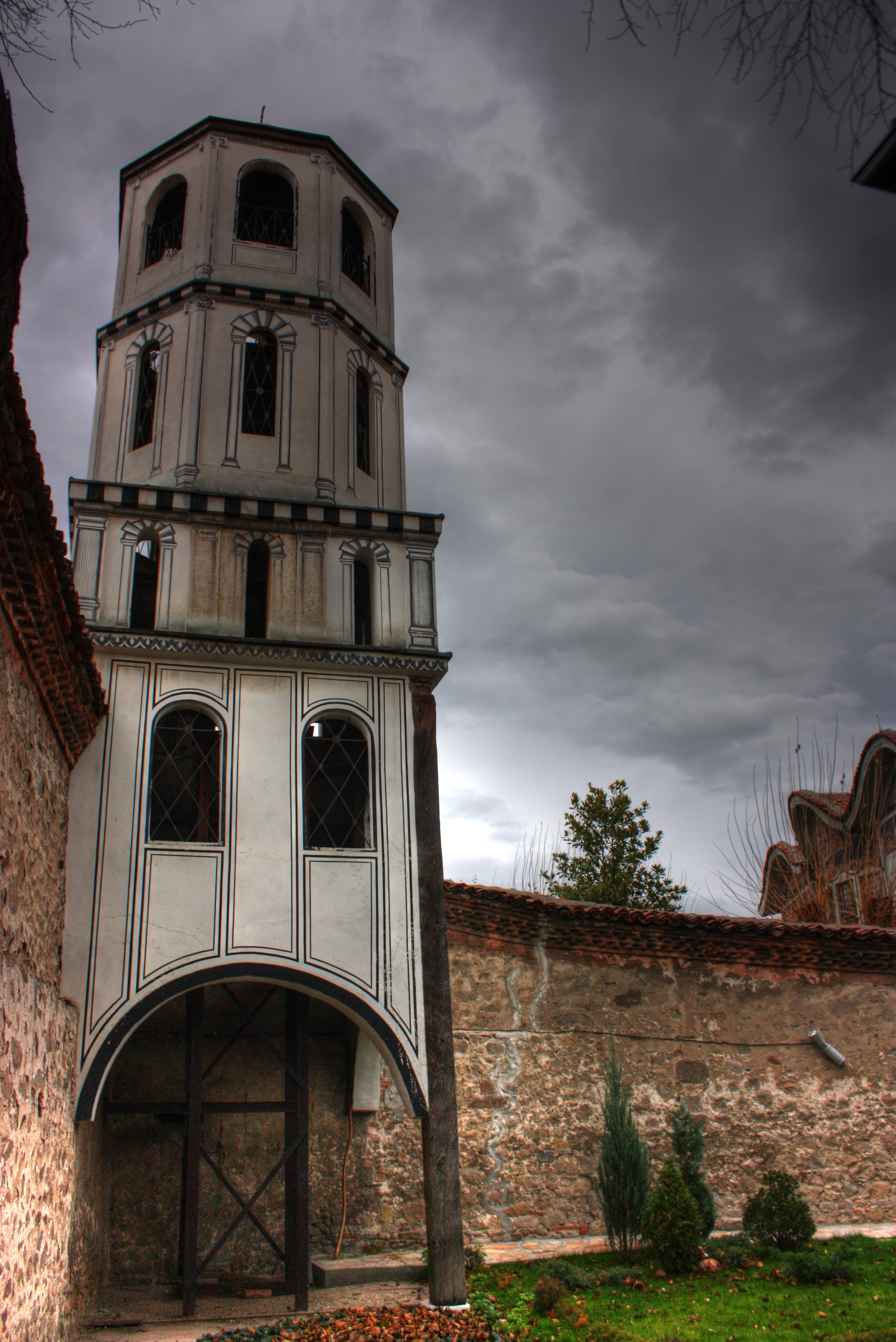
The bell tower

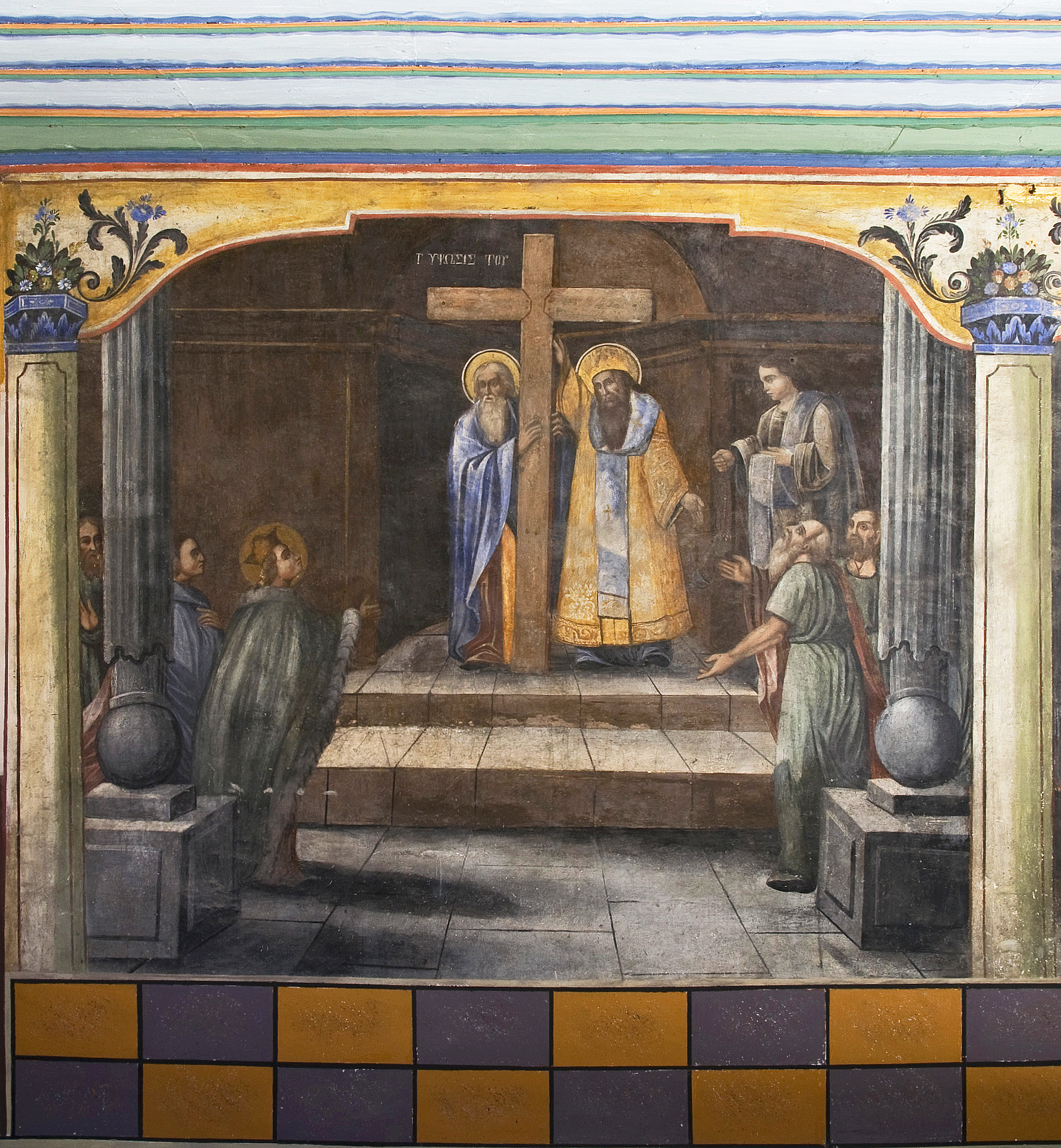
Wall fresco in the portico.

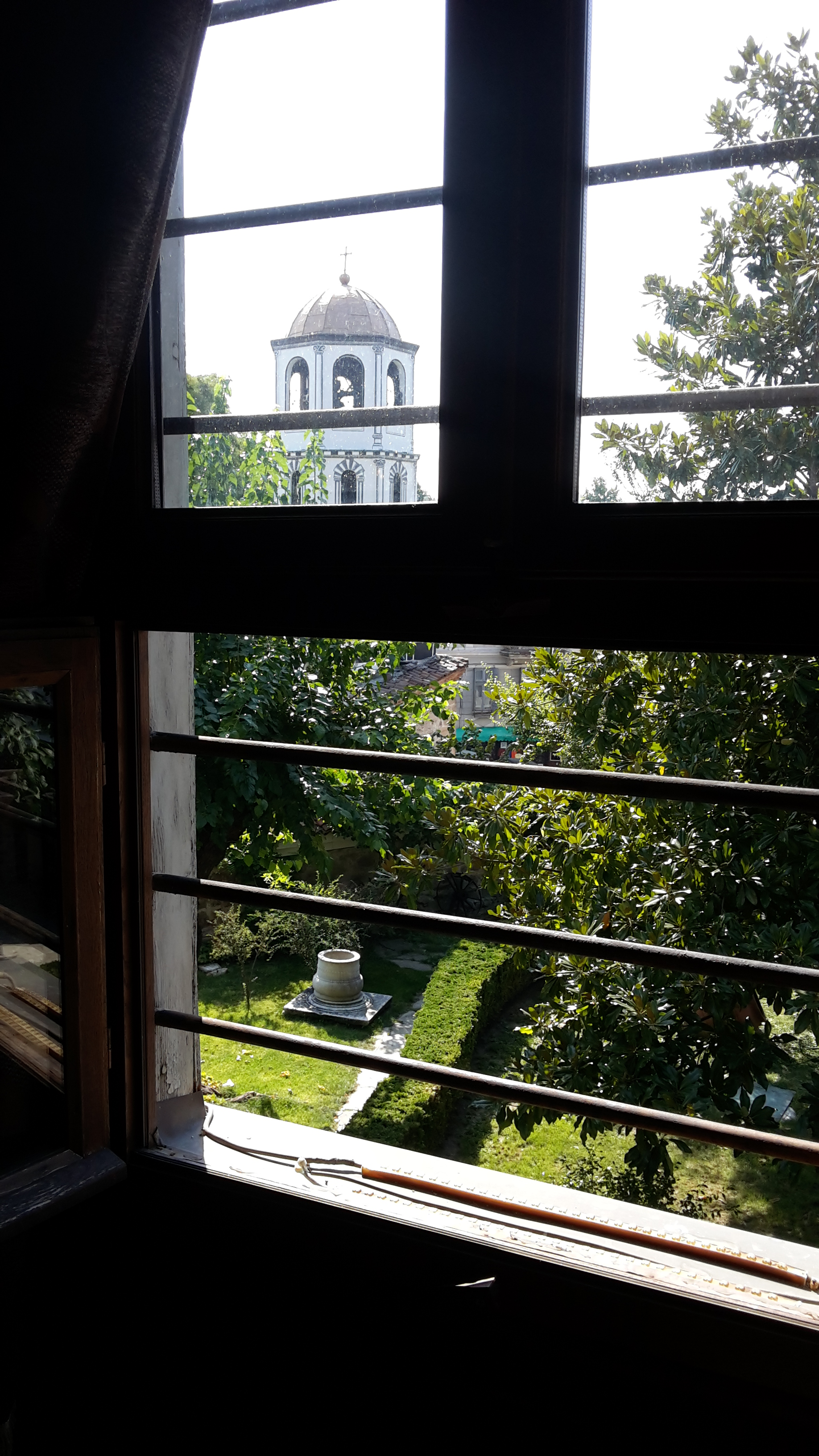
View from Plovdiv ethnographic museum
