= Novocherkassk =

City in Rostov Oblast, Russia

Novocherkassk Новочеркасск
- City
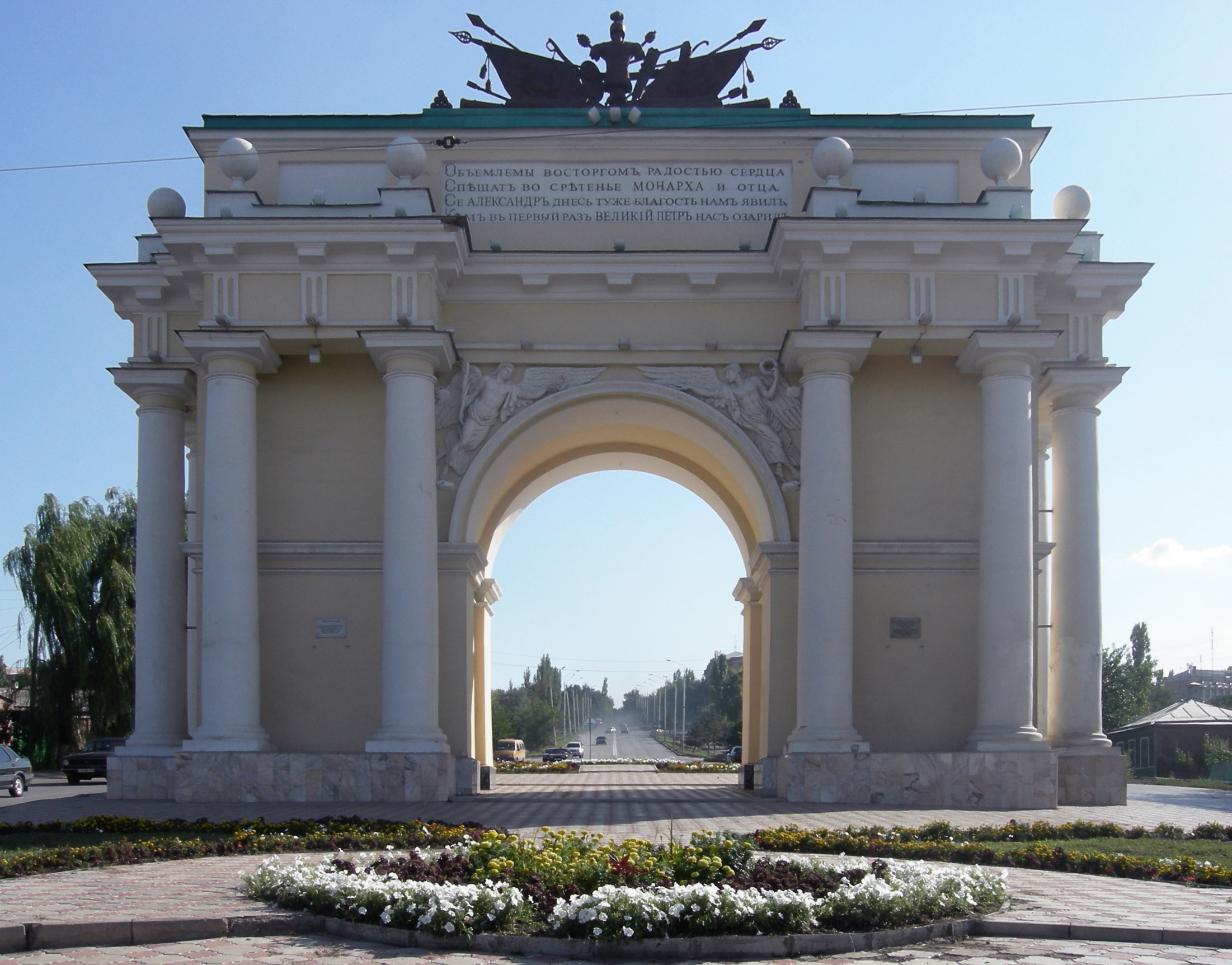

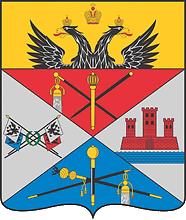
- Flag Coat of arms
- Interactive map of Novocherkassk
- Location of Novocherkassk Novocherkassk (Rostov Oblast)
- Coordinates: 47°25′20″N 40°05′38″E
- Country: Russia
- Federal subject: Rostov Oblast
- Founded: 1805

Government
  - Body: Council of Deputies
  - Head of Administration: Anatoly Volkov
- Elevation: 80 m (260 ft)

Population (2010 Census)
  - Total: 168,746
  - Estimate (1 January 2024): 160,529 (−4.9%)
  - Rank: 108th in 2010

Administrative status
  - Subordinated to: Novocherkassk Urban Okrug
  - Capital of: Novocherkassk Urban Okrug

Municipal status
  - Urban okrug: Novocherkassk Urban Okrug
  - Capital of: Novocherkassk Urban Okrug
- Time zone: UTC+3 (MSK)
- Postal code: 3464xx
- Dialing code: +7 8635
- OKTMO ID: 60727000001
- Website: www.novochgrad.ru

Novocherkassk (Russian: Новочерка́сск, lit. 'New Cherkassk') is a city in Rostov Oblast, Russia, located near the confluence of the Tuzlov and Aksay Rivers, the latter a distributary of the Don River. Novocherkassk is best known as the cultural capital of the Cossacks, and as the official capital of the Don Cossacks. Population: 168,746 (2010 census); 170,822 (2002 census); 187,973 (1989 Soviet census).

Historical population
Year	Pop.	±%
1897	52,000	—
1926	62,000	+19.2%
1939	81,000	+30.6%
1959	95,453	+17.8%
1970	162,365	+70.1%
1979	183,055	+12.7%
1989	187,973	+2.7%
2002	170,822	−9.1%
2010	168,746	−1.2%
2021	163,674	−3.0%
Source: Census data

== History ==
=== Imperial era ===
==== Foundation ====
Although the first settlement in the region was founded by Temroqwa Idar, the city of Novocherkassk was founded in 1805 by Lieutenant-general Matvei Platov, the Ataman of the Don Cossacks, as the administrative center of the Don Host Oblast. It was established in reaction to the original administrative center, the stanitsa of Cherkassk, being deemed unsuitable as the capital for the Don Cossacks for several reasons. Cherkassk was repeatedly flooded for long periods of time due to its low-lying location on the banks of the Don River, and attempts at constructing levees to protect the town were found to be too costly and ineffective. Additionally, Cherkassk was prone to destructive fires due to its chaotic layout and wooden buildings, and was located far away from any major roads. Despite the fact that ten of the eleven representatives of the villages that were part of Cherkassk refused to move the capital, Platov still made a presentation to Tsar Alexander I asking him to allow the capital of the Don Cossacks to be moved to another location, and was granted permission in a decree from the Tsar on August 23, 1804.

==== Plan as new capital of the Don Cossacks ====
Platov and the engineer François Sainte de Wollant developed Novocherkassk as a planned city, deciding to build it on a location at the top of a hill known as the "Wolf's Lair" to the north of Cherkassk, near the confluence of the Tuzlov River and Aksay River. On November 7, 1804, De Wollant and Platov presented to Tsar Alexander a plan for the future of the city and an extensive report, in which the clearly embellished merits of the area chosen for construction were described. The city was designed in the popular traditions of European models of urban development, with spacious areas, wide avenues and boulevards full of greenery. De Wollant, calling the future Novocherkassk "little Paris" on the basis of numerous town squares, each of which was supposed to feature a church, and to have streets beginning radially around each square. On December 31, 1804, after reviewing the plan and the report of Platov and De Wollant, Tsar Alexander personally inscribed: "To be according to this. Alexander". The construction of the city was slow, primarily because of the reluctance of most Don Cossacks to leave their homes in Cherkassk, and the new capital being 20 kilometres (12 miles) from the River Don, with which the Cossacks were closely connected throughout its history. To compensate, there were even plans to deepen the Aksay River (a distributary of the Don) where the new city was located to eventually alter the course of the Don through the city. This plan was abandoned due to lack of funds, and for more than three decades the question of the place of the capital of the Don Cossack remained unresolved, while growth of Novocherkassk stagnated.

By 1837, an alternative to transfer the capital to the village of Aksayskoy, which was also on a hill and near the Don, gained popularity. However, Tsar Nicholas I personally inspected Novocherkassk and the village of Aksayskoy that same year, and after returning to Saint Petersburg ordered the Don Cossacks to keep the capital in Cherkassk because of the difficulties and uselessness of the transfer. In the first half of the 19th century, Novocherkassk was built only as an army center, administrative buildings, guest yards, taverns, wine cellars, hotels, and generals and noblemen's houses. In the 1850s, industrialization reached Novocherkassk and industrial enterprises were formed, however only one-thousand of the city's twenty-thousand residents worked in them.

Stereo image
Left frame
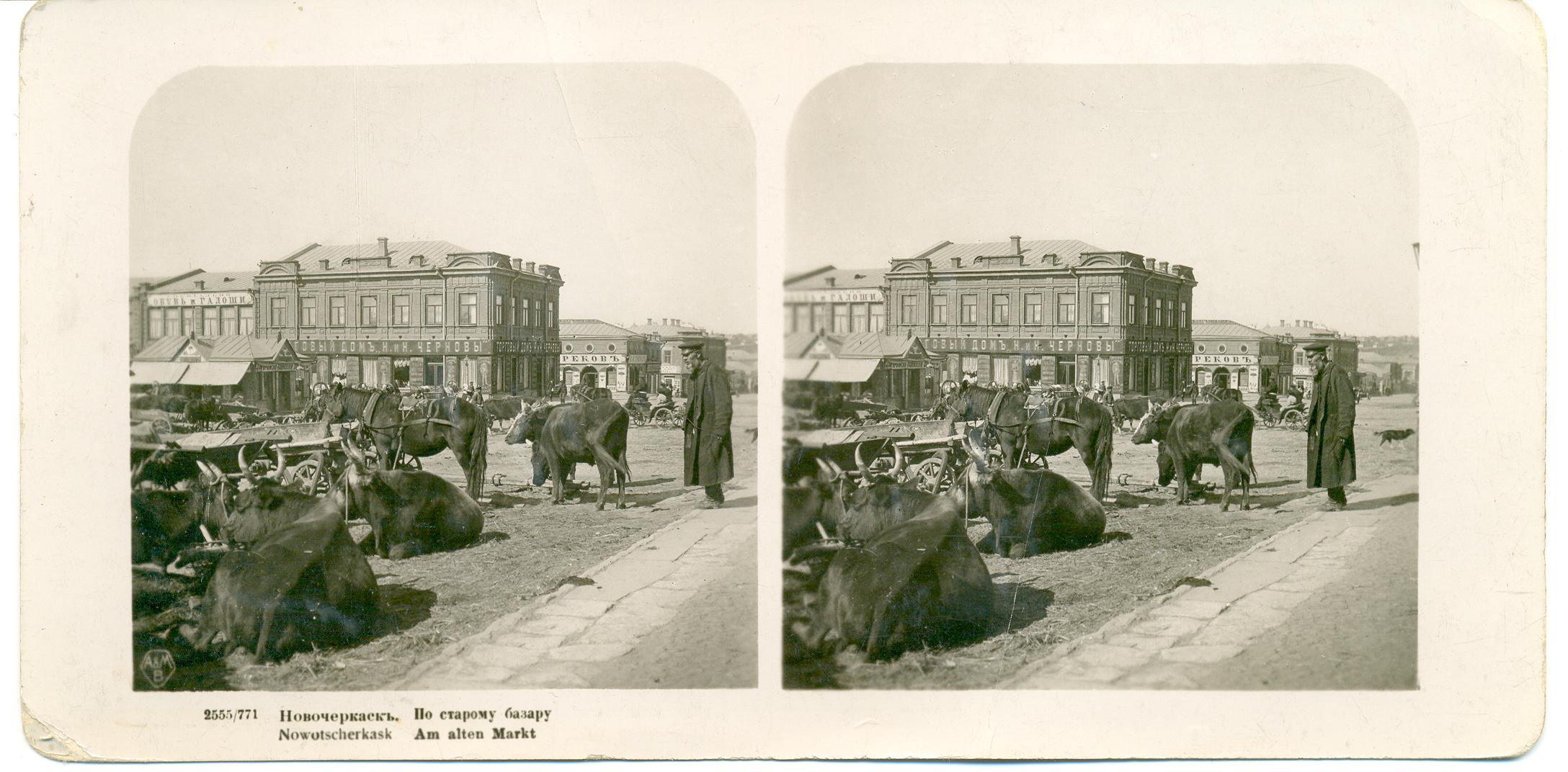
Right frame
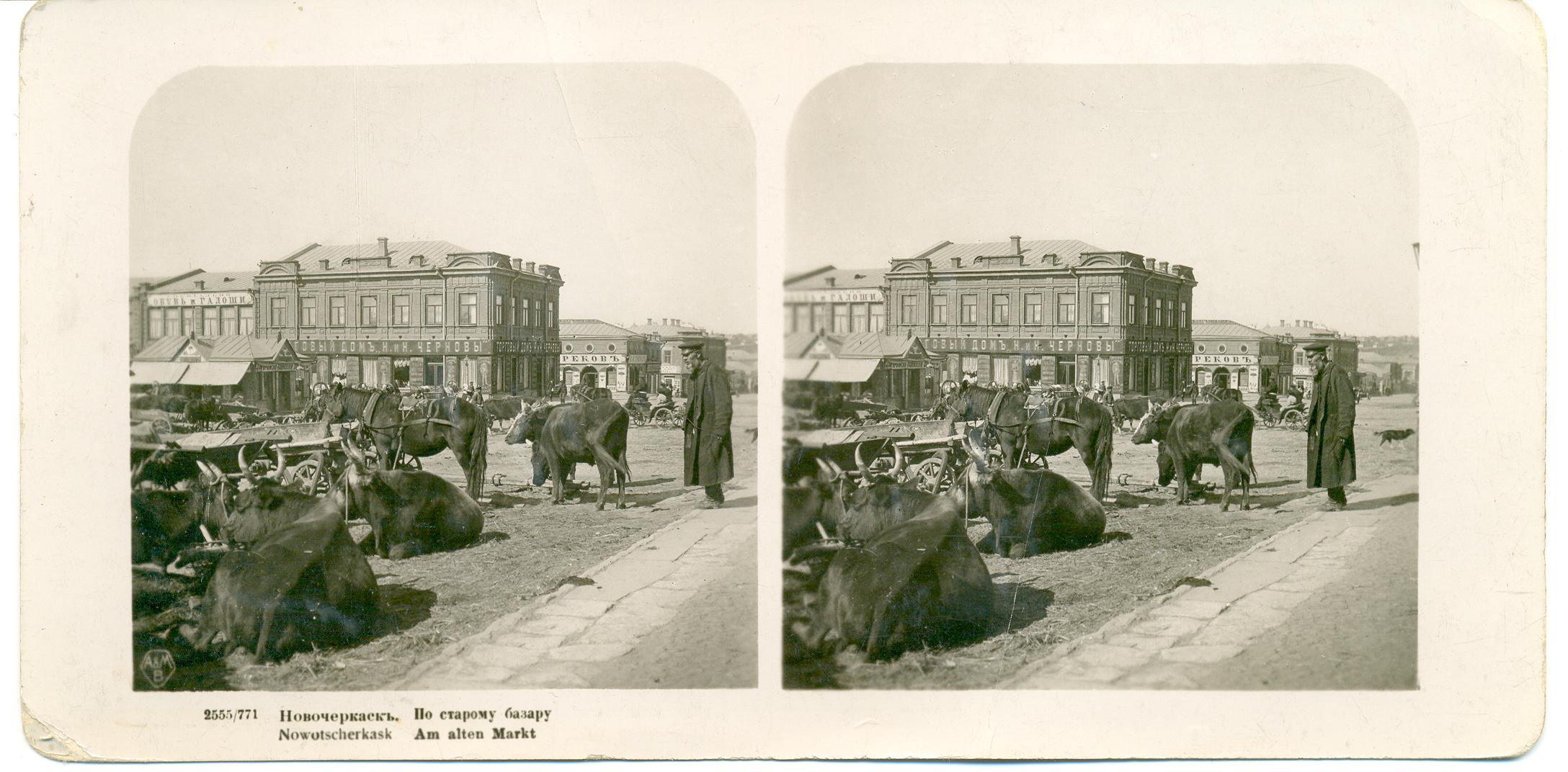
Parallel view
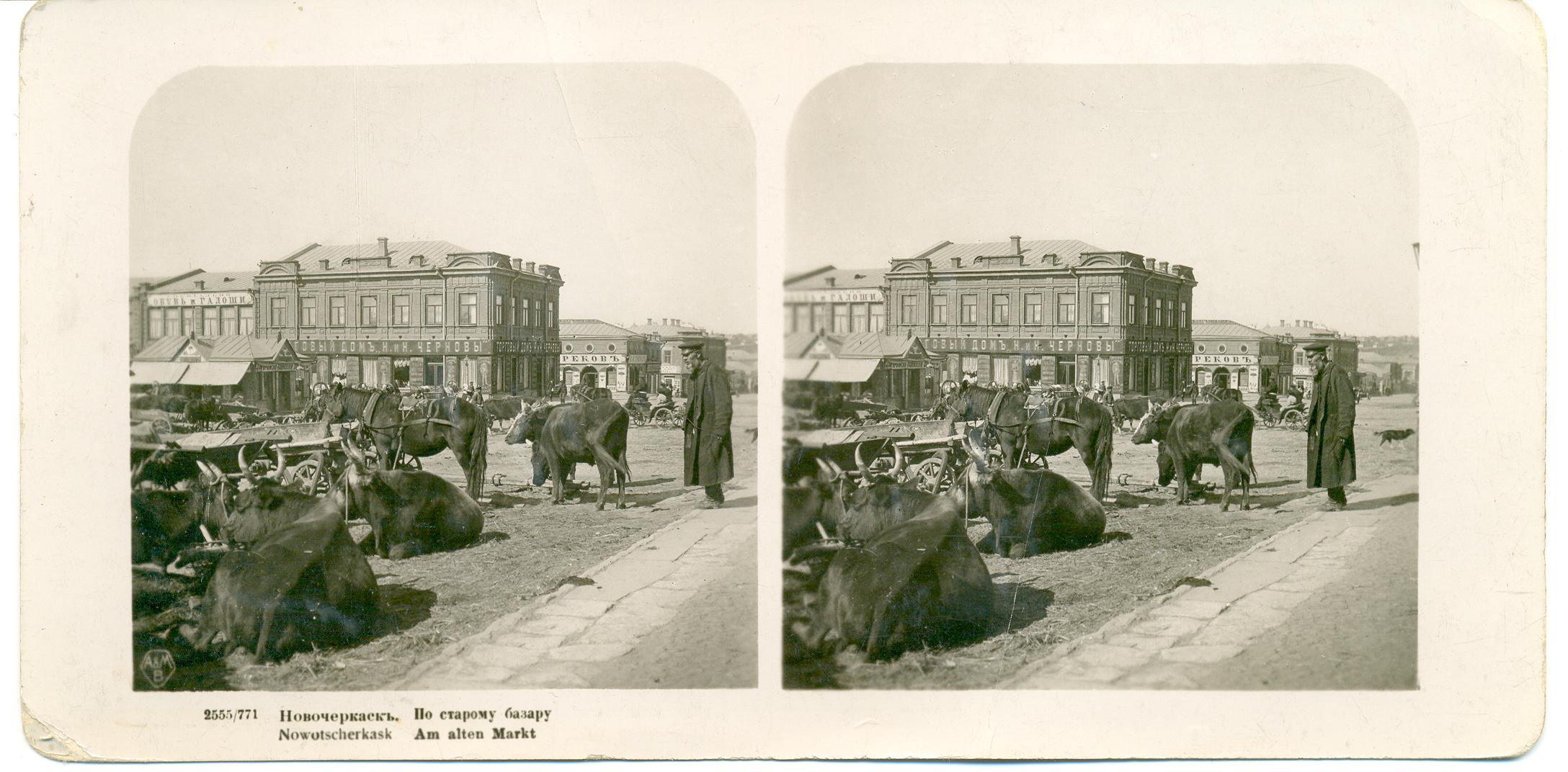
Cross-eye view
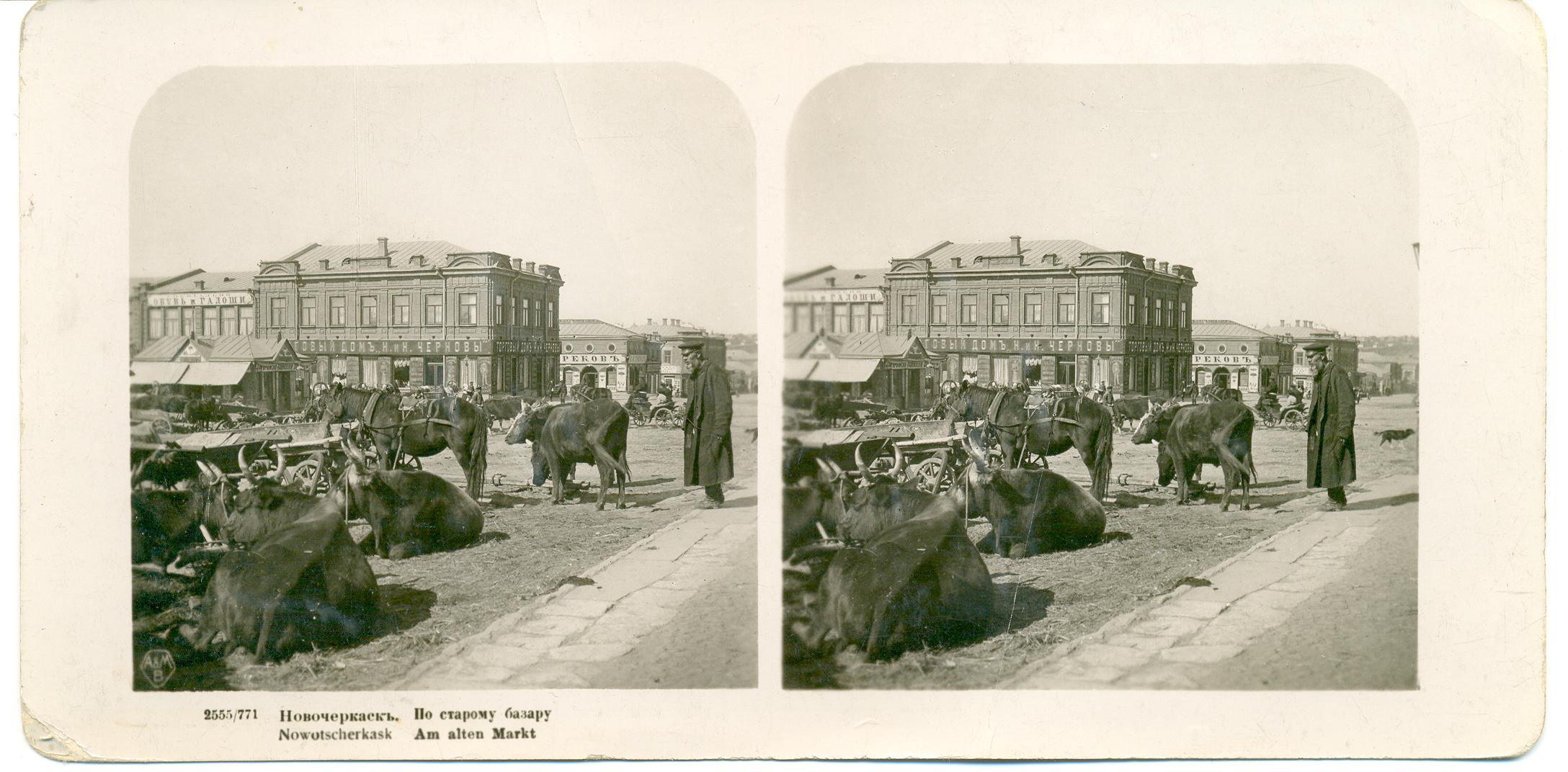

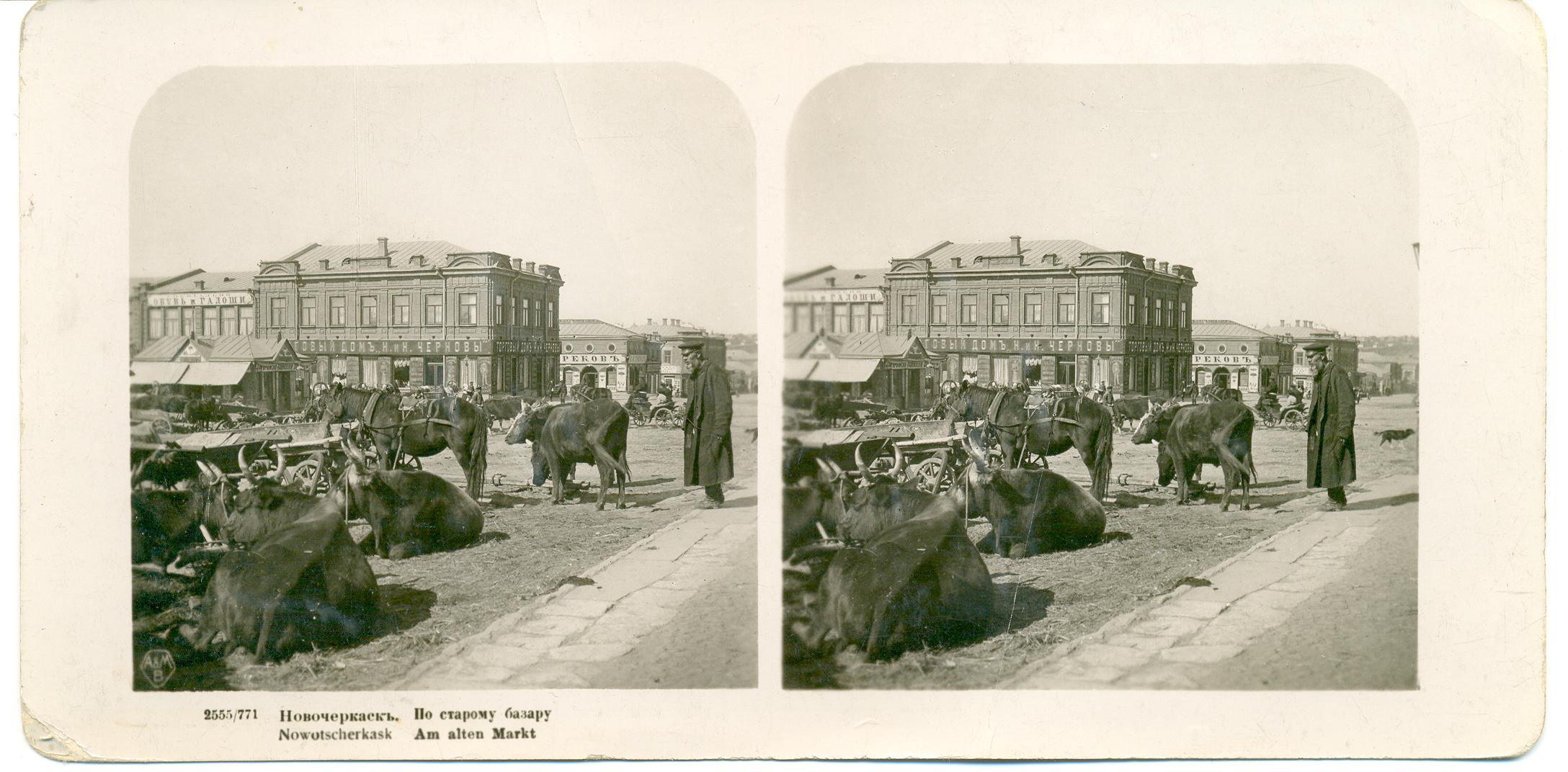
- Novocherkassk bazar scene 1900s

=== Soviet era ===
On the eve of the February Revolution, Novocherkassk had a population of about sixty thousand people, about twenty-five thousand of whom were serving Cossacks and their families, three thousand were noblemen, and about five hundred were clergymen. Novocherkassk, unlike many Russian cities at the time, had almost no permanent merchants or peasants. During the Russian Civil War from 1917 to 1922, Novocherkassk was the center of the Don Army counter-revolution and came under the command of General Alexey Kaledin. The Red Army eventually defeated ousted the White-aligned Don Army from Novocherkassk on January 7, 1920.

During World War II, the Wehrmacht of Nazi Germany occupied Novocherkassk between July 24, 1942 and February 13, 1943. The city was chosen as the headquarters of the Don Army Group, headed by Erich v. Manstein in November of 1942.

On June 1–2, 1962, events known as the Novocherkassk massacre occurred when food riots and workers rights protests broke out following a labor strike at the locomotive factory, the Novocherkassk Electric Locomotive Plant, in the city. The protests were suppressed by troops of the Soviet Army, resulting in 26 protesters being killed and 87 being wounded.

On November 20, 1990, Andrei Chikatilo, one of the Soviet Union's most prolific serial killers, with 56 convicted murders, was arrested in Novocherkassk. On 14 February 1994, he was taken from his death row cell to a soundproofed room in Novocherkassk prison and executed with a single gunshot behind the right ear. He was buried in an unmarked grave at the prison cemetery.

=== Recent history ===
On October 5–6, 1991, a meeting of the Grand Circle of the Union of Cossacks of the Don Military Region took place, where the status of the historical and modern center of the Don Cossacks was established in the city, officially making Novocherkassk the capital of the Don Cossacks. On July 17–18, 1993, a meeting of the United Supreme Circle of Cossack troops of Russia and abroad was held in Moscow, where Novocherkassk was proclaimed the world capital of the Cossacks.

== Administrative and municipal status ==
Within the framework of administrative divisions, it is incorporated as Novocherkassk Urban Okrug—an administrative unit with the status equal to that of the districts. As a municipal division, this administrative unit also has urban okrug status.

== Economy ==
Novocherkassk NEVZ ElektroVagon Plant, trains and locomotives.

== Culture and religion ==
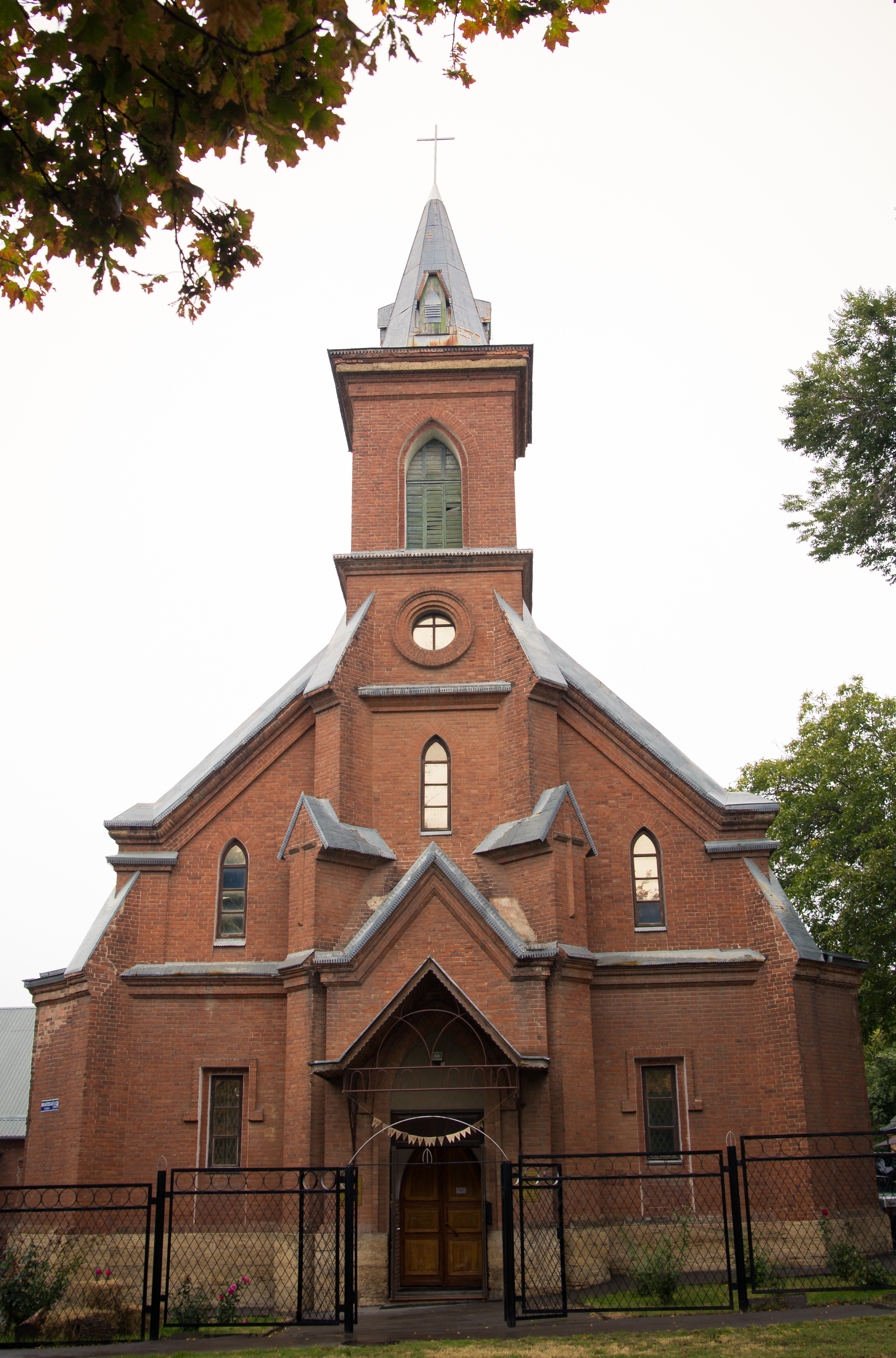
This Lutheran Church in Novocherkassk is currently used by a Baptist congregation.

Novocherkassk was once an archiepiscopal see of the Greek Orthodox Church and has a huge neo-Byzantine cathedral (1904), as well as the Church of Our Lady of the Don (2013), St. George's Church and Sts. Constantine and Helen Church, the palace of the ataman of the Cossacks, and monuments to Matvei Platov and Yermak Timofeyevich (Mikhail Mikeshin, 1904). During the bicentenary celebrations in September 2005 another monument, dedicated to the reconciliation of White and Red Cossacks, was opened in the presence of the members of the Romanov family.

In 1856, the Trinity Church was built, but later it was destroyed.

Saint Dimitry's Church is dedicated to Demetrius of Thessaloniki, it was built in 1859.

=== Cinemas ===
- Tanais

=== Monuments ===
- Horse Monument to Platov
- Monument to Yakov Baklanov

=== Buildings ===
- Palace of Ceremonies

== Twin towns – sister cities ==
Novocherkassk is twinned with:

- Iserlohn, Germany
- Levski, Bulgaria
- Novi Bečej, Serbia
- La Valette-du-Var, France

== Notable people ==
- Andrey Esipenko (born 2002), chess grandmaster
- Witold Łokuciewski (1917–1990), Polish fighter ace renowned for flying in the 303rd Squadron during the Battle of Britain.
- Yuriy Sedykh (born 1955), hammer thrower; a World and Olympic Champion holding the world record with a throw of 86.74 m.
- Valerian Zorin (1902–1986), Soviet diplomat and ambassador, and Deputy Minister of Foreign Affairs
- Alexey Kaledin, Cossack general who fought for the Tsarist Army during the First World War died by his own hand in 1918.
