= Church of Saints Emperor Constantine and Empress Helena =

Coordinates: 43.582062°N 20.229316°E

Church of St. Emperor Constantine and Empress Helena
- Црква Светог цара Константина и царице Јелене
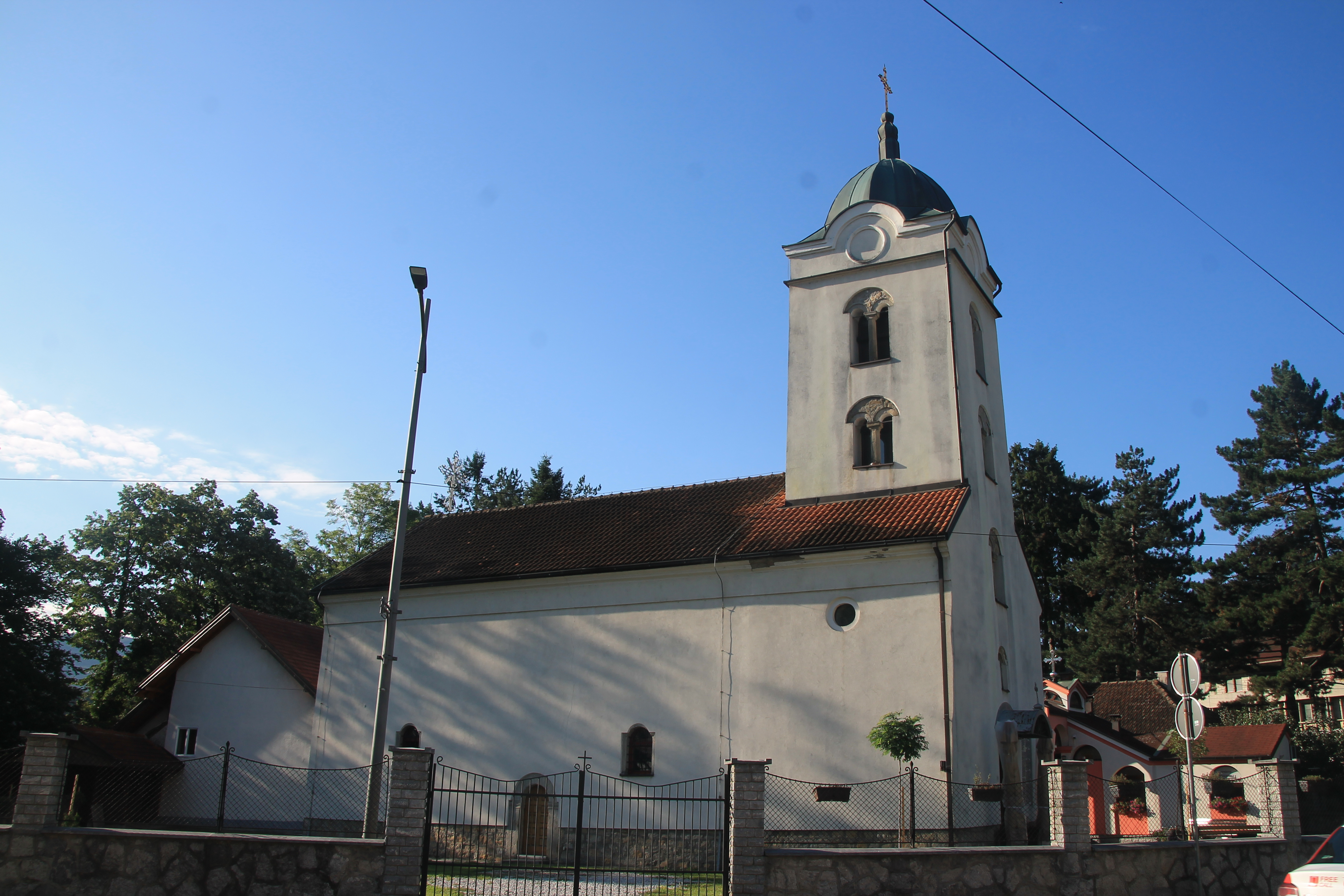
- Church as seen from the town center street

- Location within Serbia
- Location: Ivanjica
- Country: Serbia
- Denomination: Serbian Orthodox Church

History
- Status: Church
- Founded: 1838
- Founder: Miloš Obrenović

Architecture
- Functional status: Active

Specifications
- Materials: Stone

The Church of St. Emperor Constantine and Empress Helena (Serbian Cyrillic: Црква Светог цара Константина и царице Јелене) is a church of the Serbian Orthodox Church, located in The Old Bazaar of Ivanjica.

== History ==
The construction of the church started immediately after the town of Ivanjica was founded in 1833, following the liberation of the area from the Ottoman Empire in the Serbian Revolution. The construction works were funded by the locals and supervised by Miloš Obrenović. In 1836, the construction works were finished. The first restoration of the church was in the 1850s, and an artist from the time period, Dimitrije Posniković, painted it in 1862. Authentic iconostasis were saved and remain today.

== Gallery ==
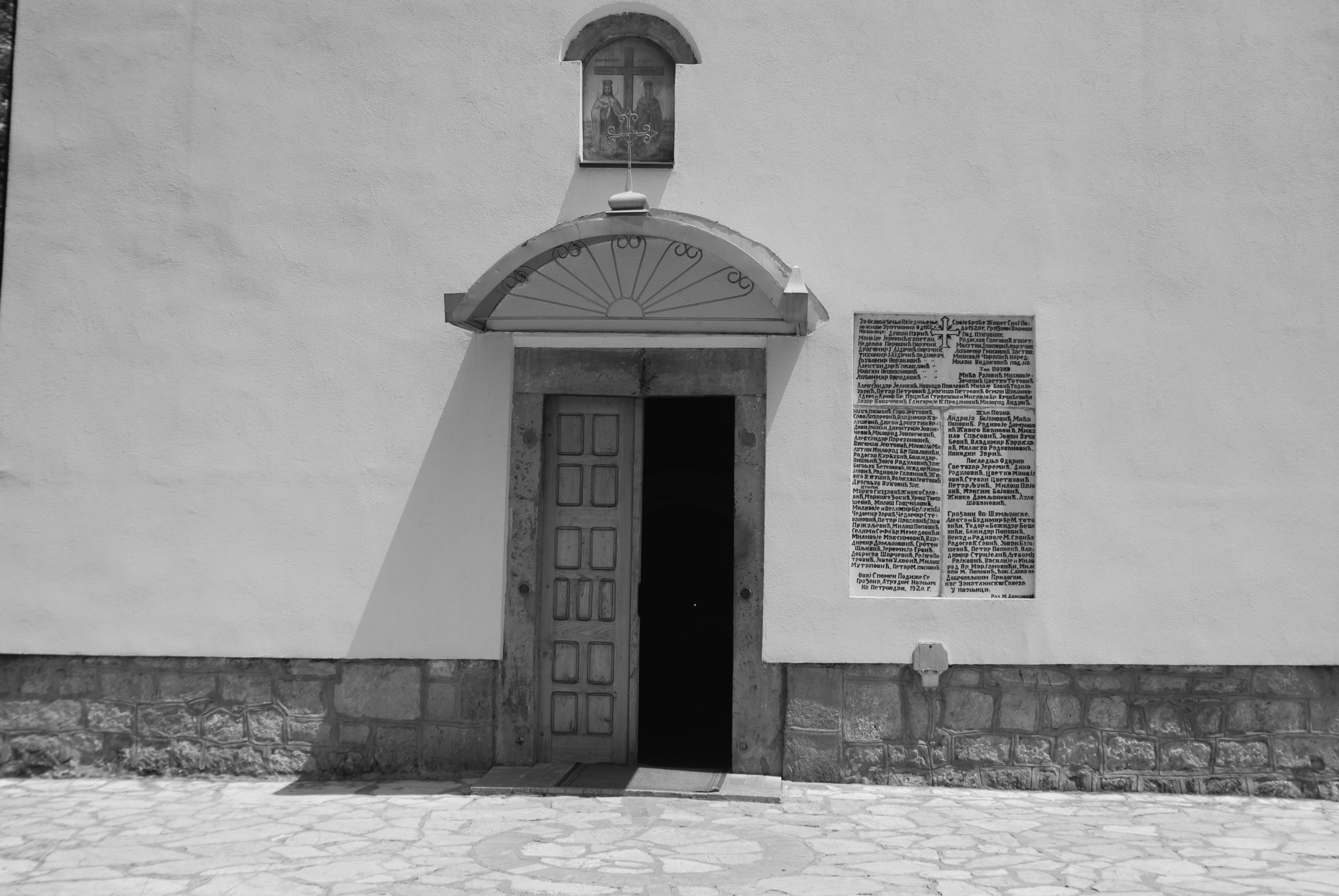
Church's porta

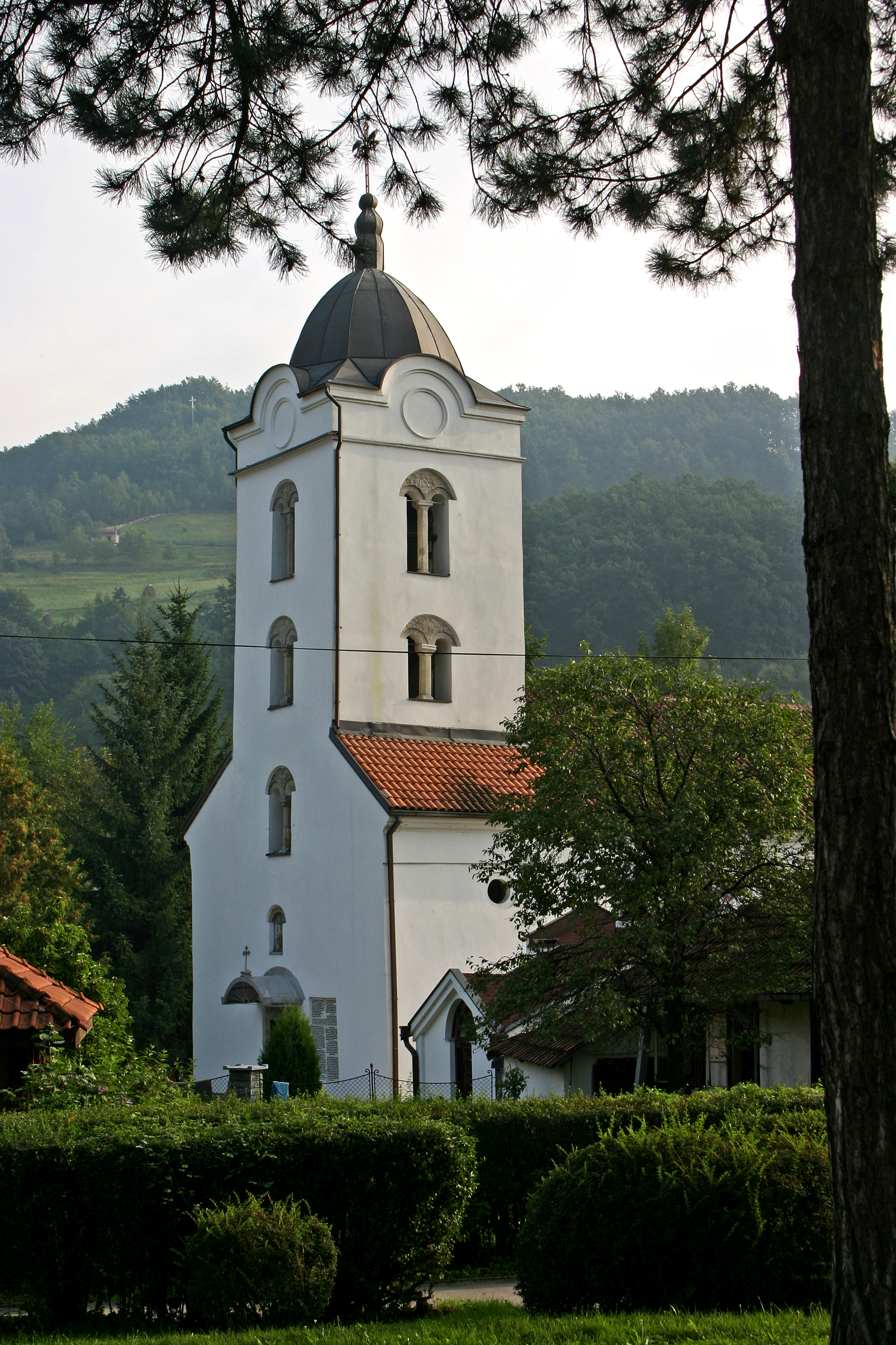
Church from nearby park

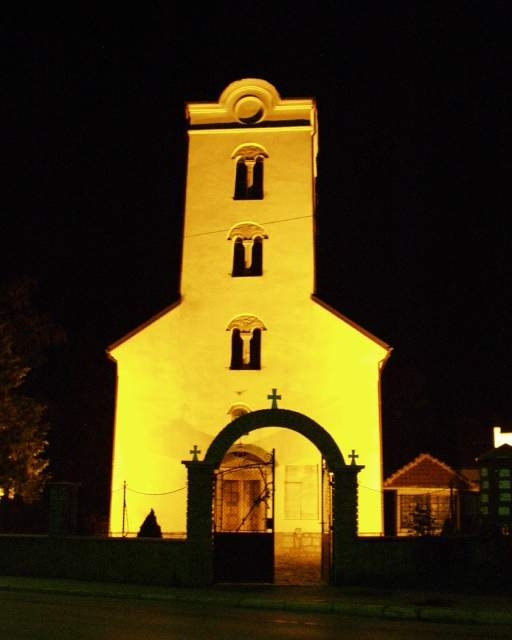
Church at night
