= Eagles Fly Early =

Eagles Fly Early refers to:

- Eagles Fly Early (novel), 1959 Yugoslav children's novel by Branko Ćopić
- Eagles Fly Early (film), 1966 film based on the novel
