= Drekavac =

Mythical creature in South Slavic mythology

Drekavac (literally "the screamer" or "the screecher"), also called drekalo, krekavac, zdrekavac or zrikavac, is a mythical creature in South Slavic mythology. The name is derived from the verb "drečati" ("to screech").

== Description ==
In South Slavic mythology and folk tales this creature has been variously described:

- In some folk tales it is depicted as an undead man who emerges from his grave by night to haunt the living.
- In others the revenant is portrayed as unbaptised child which rises from its grave at night to haunt its parents and can also sometimes be heard entreating people passing cemeteries to baptise it and thus end its misery.
- In Eastern Serbia it has been depicted in the form of a humanoid canine creature that walks on its back legs.
- In the vicinity of Maglaj it has been depicted in the form of ghosts of soldiers that wander around during night time, scaring people.
- In the vicinity of Kozarska Dubica it has been depicted as a vampire-like undead man that rises out of the grave during night time, and wanders around scaring people.
- In the vicinity of Arilje it has been depicted in form of a long-necked long-legged creature with a cat-like head.
- In Sredačka župa it has been depicted in the form of a one-legged humanoid creature with glowing eyes that wanders around during night time and scares people.
- In the vicinity of Prijepolje, Lešak and Dragačevo it has been depicted as an apparition that can be seen in form of a dappled foal, dog, cat, or bird.
- In the vicinity of Gruža it has been depicted in the form of a creature having a dappled, elongated and spindle-thin body with a disproportionately large head. This creature can't fly and it is believed to be the soul of a dead child.
- In the vicinity of Banovići specifically in the village of Čifluk it has been depicted as an ape with white hair, bear-sized claws, long limbs, long tail, elongated body and an elongated head that may resemble that of a dog especially because it is reported to have big sharp teeth. It is said it likes to stalk its victims.

A modern description of a supposed drekavac describes it as a canine creature similar to a dog or some kind of bird.

== Original beliefs ==
The drekavac was originally thought to have come from the souls of sinful men, or from children who died unbaptised.

It was popularly believed to be visible only at night, especially during the twelve days of Christmas (called unbaptised days in Serbo-Croatian) and in early spring, when other demons and mythical creatures were believed to be more active. When assuming the form of a child, it predicts someone's death, while in its animal form, it predicts cattle disease. The drekavac is believed to avoid dogs and bright light. Also, it is believed that if the shadow of drekavac falls upon some person then that person will turn sick and die.

== Modern sightings ==
Although the creature is mostly used in cautionary tales for children, there are also some adults who still believe in its existence. According to the guide of a reporter of Duga magazine, numerous villagers on the mountain of Zlatibor report seeing it, and many inhabitants claim to have heard it.

Some modern sightings happened:

- In 1992, it was reported that in the Krvavica, the villagers found remains of an animal unlike any known from the area, and claimed it was a drekavac. It was described as looking like a dog, but with a "snake-like" head and hind legs "similar" to those of a kangaroo. Later, it was revealed to be just a rotten carcass of a fox.
- In 2003, in the village of Tometino Polje near Divcibare, a series of attacks on sheep occurred, with some villagers concluding that they had been perpetrated by a drekavac. Other villagers disagreed, seeing as the attacks took place in the daytime, as opposed to night, when the drekavac is supposedly more active.

== Appearances and references in fiction ==
=== In literature ===
- Drekavac is mentioned in a short story by Branko Ćopić, "Brave Mita and drekavac from the pond" (Cyrillic: "Храбри Мита и дрекавац из рита") in which a group of superstitious fishermen stop fishing because they hear mysterious yells in the pond, where they were usually fishing, and start believing that they hear a drekavac, which leads to hunger in the village. The protagonist of the story, a courageous village boy named Mita, investigates this mystery and captures the "drekavac", which turns out to be a great bittern, a bird very rare for the area.
- Drekavac is also mentioned in Ćopić's book Eagles Fly Early.
- Drekavac is a character in Larry Correia's novel Monster Hunter Bloodlines.

=== In games ===
- In the Magic: The Gathering has a card of drekavac from the Dissension set.
- In EVE Online, the Drekavac is a combat battlecruiser flown by the Triglavian Collective.
- The Serbian trading card game Izvori Magije has numerous cards of drekavac type creatures, one of them named Drekavac iz vira (meaning "Drekavac from the whirlpool"). This creature is described as: "Big-headed and with long thin necks, drekavac often jump out of whirlpools to attack people who are returning home from watermills."
- In DmC: Devil May Cry, a demon named Drekavac appears as a recurrent enemy. It is not named as such until player's final encounter with it. Rather than claws, it possesses long thin swords.
- In game Superhuman by Weird World, Drekavac is a humanoid monster with canine face, horns and thick fur around the neck, often covered in lacerations, effect of its masochism. It is a powerful monster that can influence souls, primarily its own, to reconstitute or move its body around, return from being dead, or even resurrect others to life.

=== In music ===
- "Drekavac" is the title of a song written and performed by the Serbian thrash metal band Horror Piknik.
- "Drekavac" is also the title of a Lordi song from their 2021 project Lordiversity.

== Similar mythical creatures ==
- Bukavac – recorded in Syrmia, a six-legged monster with gnarled horns, slimy skin and long tail, that lives in water (rivers, swamps and creeks) and comes out of it during the night. It is known that it makes loud noises, and it will try to strangle people and animals that it encounters;
- Jaud (pronounced [jaud]) – a vampirised premature baby;
- Myling – from Scandinavian folklore, a phantasmal incarnations of the souls of unbaptized children that had been forced to roam the earth;
- Nav – the soul of dead child that died before its third age;
- Plakavac – recorded in Herzegovina, is a newborn strangled by its mother, which will rise from its grave at night as small vampire-like creature, return to its house and scream around it, but otherwise can't do any harm;
- Poroniec – a hostile and malicious demon from Slavic mythology. They were believed to come into existence from stillborn fetuses, but also from improperly buried remains of children who had died during infancy.

== See also ==
- Bukavac
- Myling
- Poroniec
- Restless ghost
