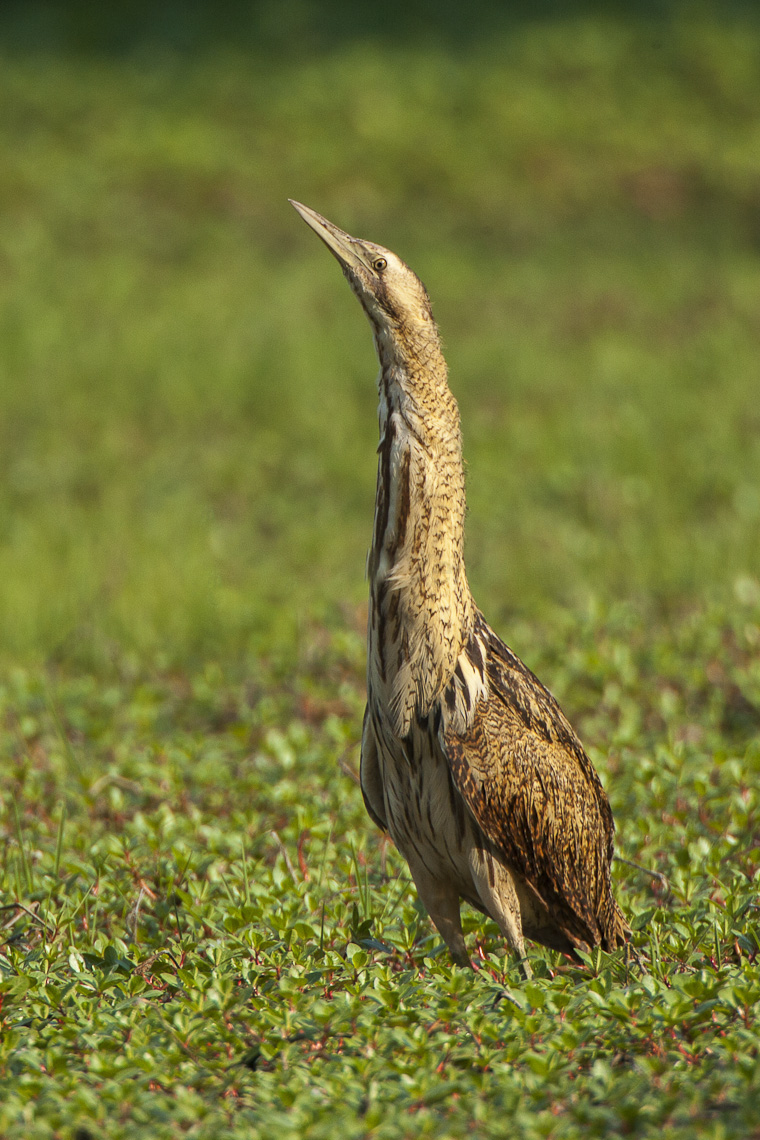

Conservation status
- Least Concern (IUCN 3.1)

Scientific classification
- Kingdom: Animalia
- Phylum: Chordata
- Class: Aves
- Order: Pelecaniformes
- Family: Ardeidae
- Genus: Botaurus
- Species: B. stellaris

Binomial name
- Botaurus stellaris (Linnaeus, 1758)

Subspecies
- B. s. stellaris Linnaeus, 1758; B. s. capensis (Schlegel, 1863)
- Range of Botaurus stellaris: breeding year-round nonbreeding

Synonyms
- Ardea stellaris Linnaeus, 1758

= Eurasian bittern =

Species of bird

The Eurasian bittern or great bittern (Botaurus stellaris) is a wading bird in the bittern subfamily (Botaurinae) of the heron family Ardeidae. There are two subspecies, the northern race (B. s. stellaris) breeding in parts of Europe and across the Palearctic, as well as on the northern coast of Africa, while the southern race (B. s. capensis) is endemic to parts of southern Africa. It is a secretive bird, seldom seen in the open as it prefers to skulk in reed beds and thick vegetation near water bodies. Its presence is apparent in the spring, when the booming call of the male during the breeding season can be heard. It feeds on fish, small mammals, fledgling birds, amphibians, crustaceans and insects.

The nest is usually built among reeds at the edge of bodies of water. The female incubates the clutch of eggs and feeds the young chicks, which leave the nest when about two weeks old. She continues to care for them until they are fully fledged some six weeks later.

With its specific habitat requirements and the general reduction in wetlands across its range, the population is thought to be in decline globally. However the decline is slow, and the International Union for Conservation of Nature has assessed its overall conservation status as being of "least concern". Nevertheless, some local populations are at risk and the population of the southern race has declined more dramatically and is cause for concern. In the United Kingdom it is one of the most threatened of all bird species.

== Taxonomy and etymology ==
This species was first described as Ardea asteria sive stellaris as early as 1603 by Ulisse Aldrovandi in his Ornithologiae. In 1660 the ornithologist Thomas Browne referred to it as Ardea stellaris botaurus and then the Swedish naturalist Carl Linnaeus in his Systema Naturae of 1758 named it again as Ardea stellaris. It is placed in the subfamily Botaurinae, and its closest relatives are the American bittern (Botaurus lentiginosus), the pinnated bittern (Botaurus pinnatus) and the Australasian bittern (Botaurus poiciloptilus). Two races of Eurasian bittern are recognised; the nominate subspecies B. s. stellaris has a palearctic distribution and occurs across a broad swathe of Europe, North Africa and Asia, while the other subspecies, B. s. capensis, occurs only in southern Africa. The name capensis was used for species found in the Afrotropics for which no exact range was known.

The generic name Botaurus was given by the English naturalist James Francis Stephens, and is derived from Medieval Latin butaurus, "bittern", itself constructed from the Middle English name for the bird, botor. Pliny gave a fanciful derivation from Bos (ox) and taurus (bull), because the bittern's call resembles the bellowing of a bull. The species name stellaris is Latin for "starred", from stella, "star", and refers to the speckled plumage.

Its folk names, often local, include many variations on the themes of "barrel-maker", "bog-bull", "water-bull", "bog hen", "bog-trotter", "bog-bumper", "mire drum[ble]", "butter bump", "bitter bum", "bog blutter", "bog drum", "boom bird", "bottle-bump", "bull of the bog", "bull of the mire", "bumpy cors", and "heather blutter". Most of these were onomatopoeic colloquial names for the bird; the call was described as "bumping" or "booming". Mire and bog denote the bird's habitat.

== Description ==
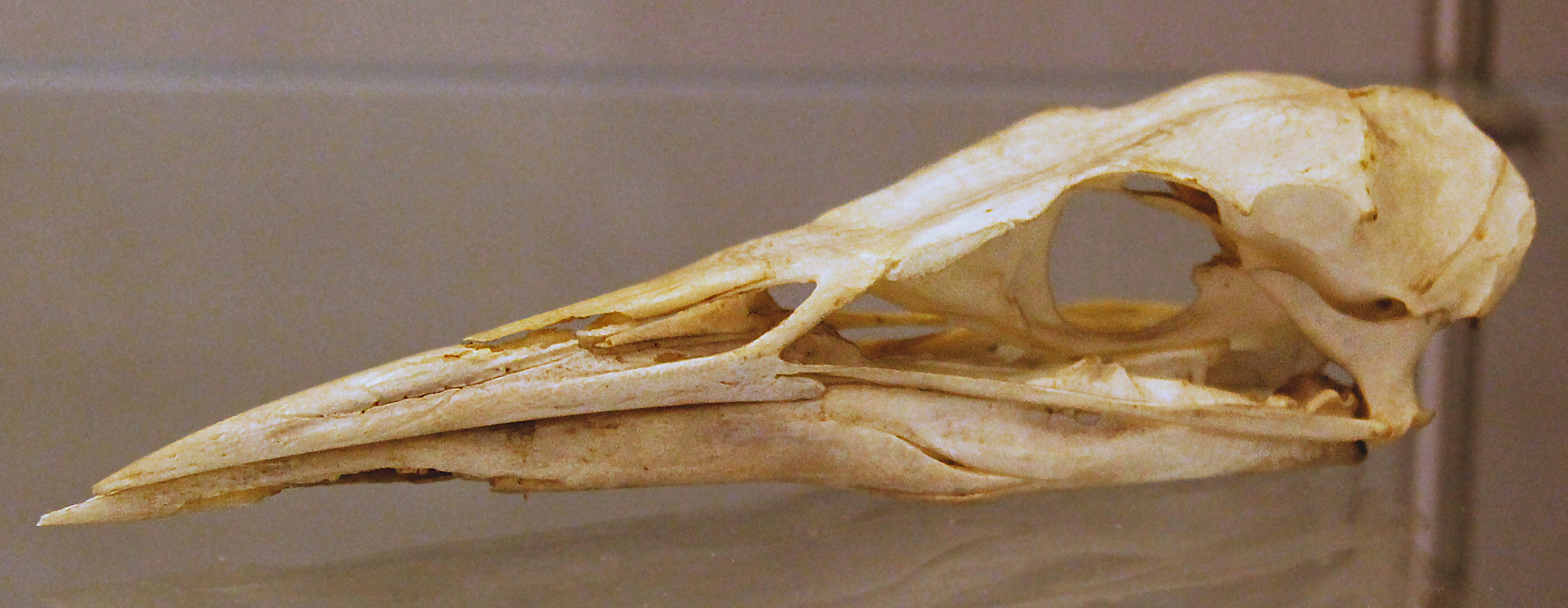
A Eurasian bittern skull

Bitterns are thickset herons with bright, pale, buffy-brown plumage covered with dark streaks and bars. As its alternative name suggests, this species is the largest of the bitterns, with males being rather larger than females. The Eurasian or great bittern is 69–81 cm (27–32 in) in length, with a 100–130 cm (40–50 in) wingspan and a body mass of 0.87–1.94 kg (1 lb 14 1/2 oz – 4 lb 4 1/2 oz).

The crown and nape are black, with the individual feathers rather long and loosely arranged, tipped with buff narrowly barred with black. The sides of the head and neck are a more uniform tawny-buff, irregularly barred with black. The mantle, scapulars and back are of a similar colour but are more heavily barred, the individual feathers having black centres and barring. The head has a yellowish-buff superciliary stripe and a brownish-black moustachial stripe. The sides of the neck are a rusty-brown with faint barring. The chin and throat are buff, the central feathers on the throat having longitudinal stripes of rusty-brown. The breast and belly are yellowish-buff, with broad stripes of brown at the side and narrow stripes in the centre. The tail is rusty-buff with black streaks in the centre and black mottling near the edge. The wings are pale rusty-brown irregularly barred, streaked and mottled with black. The plumage has a loose texture, and elongated feathers on the crown, neck and breast can be erected. The powerful bill is greenish-yellow with a darker tip to the upper mandible. The eye has a yellow iris and is surrounded by a ring of greenish or bluish bare skin. The legs and feet are greenish, with some yellow on the tarsal joint and yellow soles to the feet. Juveniles have similar plumage to adults but are somewhat paler with less distinct markings.

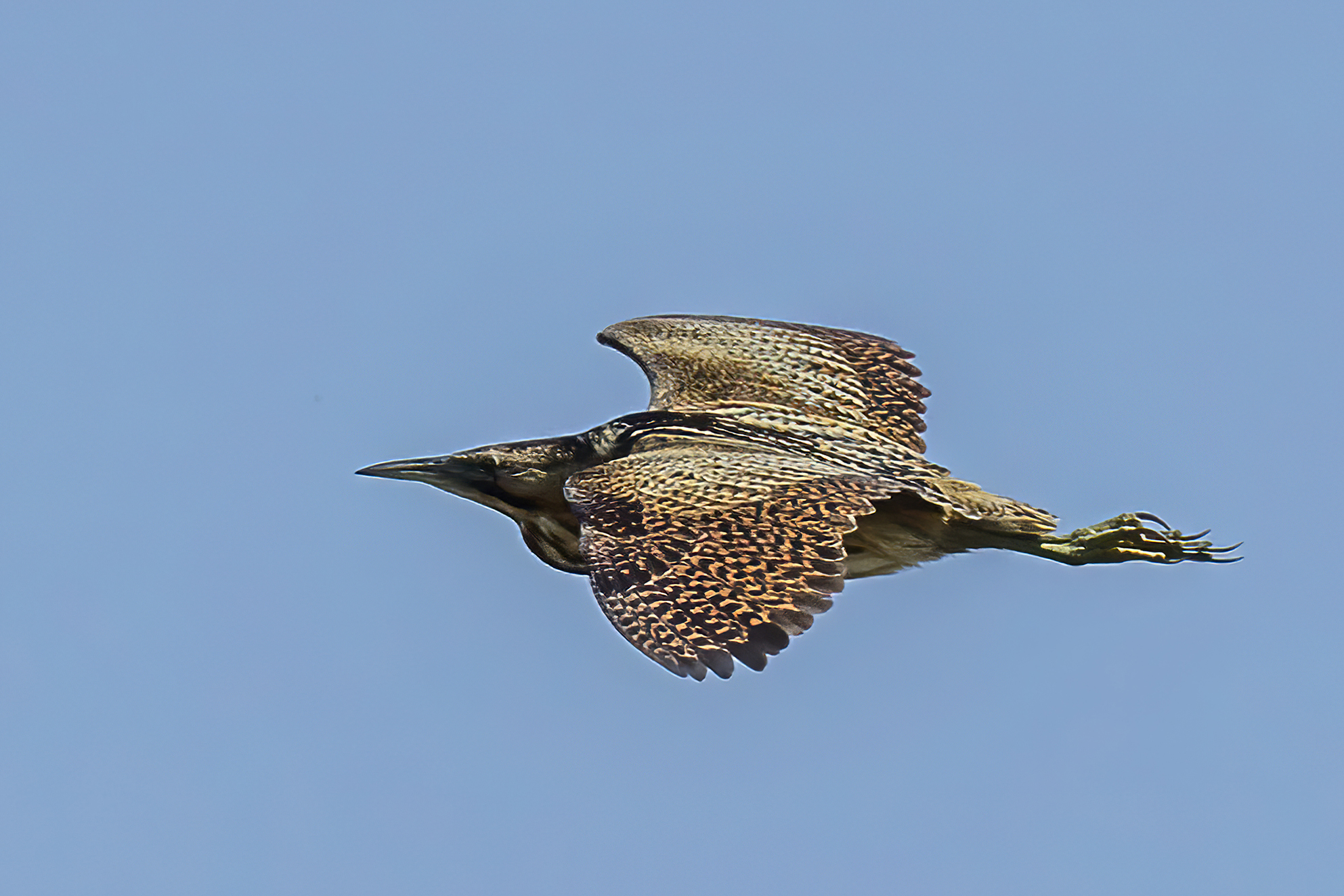

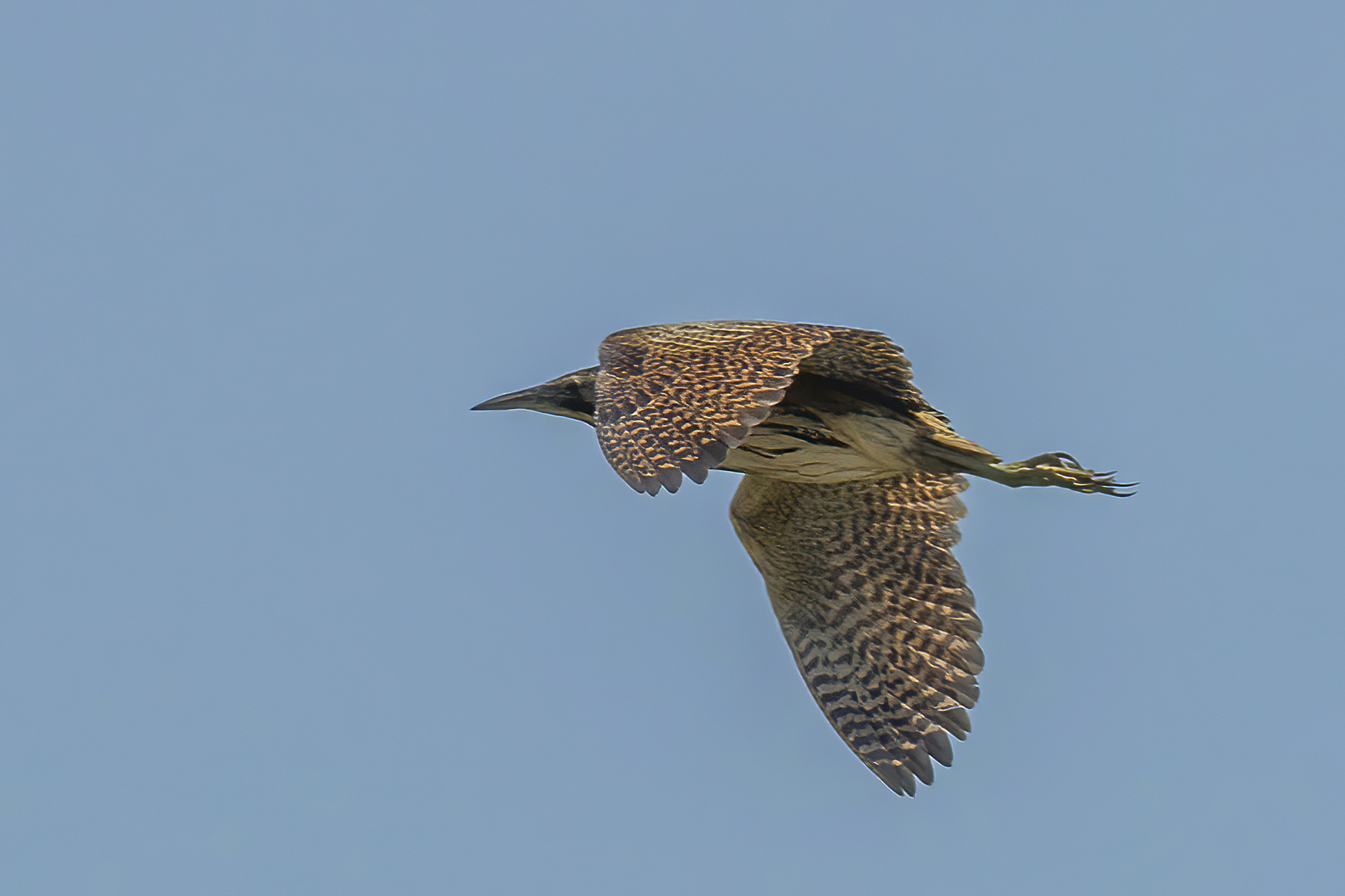

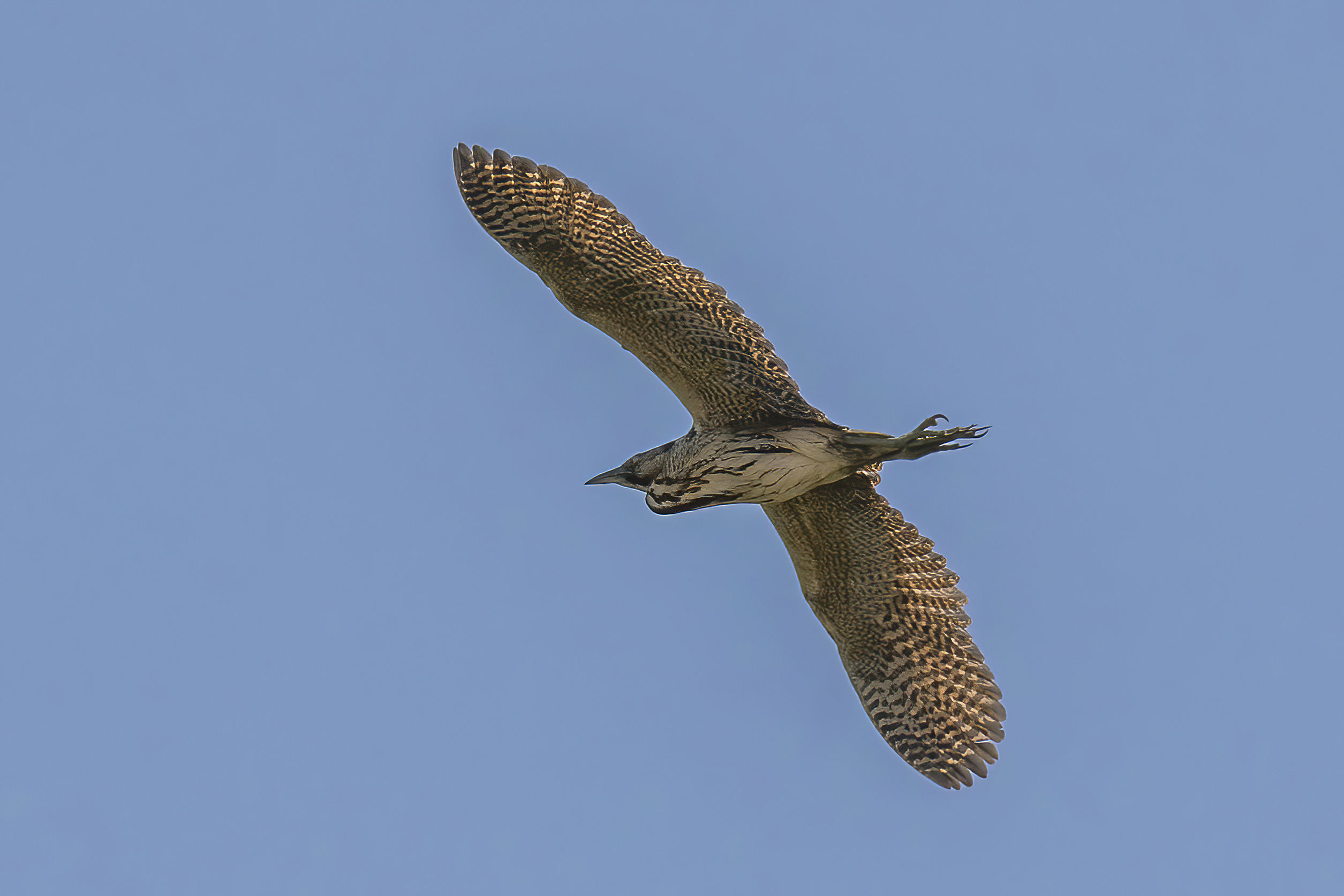

== Distribution and habitat ==
The breeding range of B. s. stellaris extends across temperate parts of Europe and Asia from the British Isles, Sweden and Finland eastwards to Sakhalin Island in eastern Siberia, Korea and Hokkaido Island in Japan. The bird's northern extent of occurrence is around 57°N in the Ural Mountains and 64°N in eastern Siberia. Its southern limit is the Mediterranean Sea, the Black Sea, Iran, Afghanistan, Kazakhstan, Mongolia and Hebei Province in northern China. Small resident populations also breed in Morocco, Algeria and Tunisia. It typically inhabits reed beds (Phragmites) and swamps, as well as lakes, lagoons and sluggish rivers fringed by rank vegetation. It sometimes nests by ponds in agricultural areas, and even quite near habitations where suitable habitat exists, but for preference, chooses large reed beds of at least 20 hectares (50 acres) in which to breed.

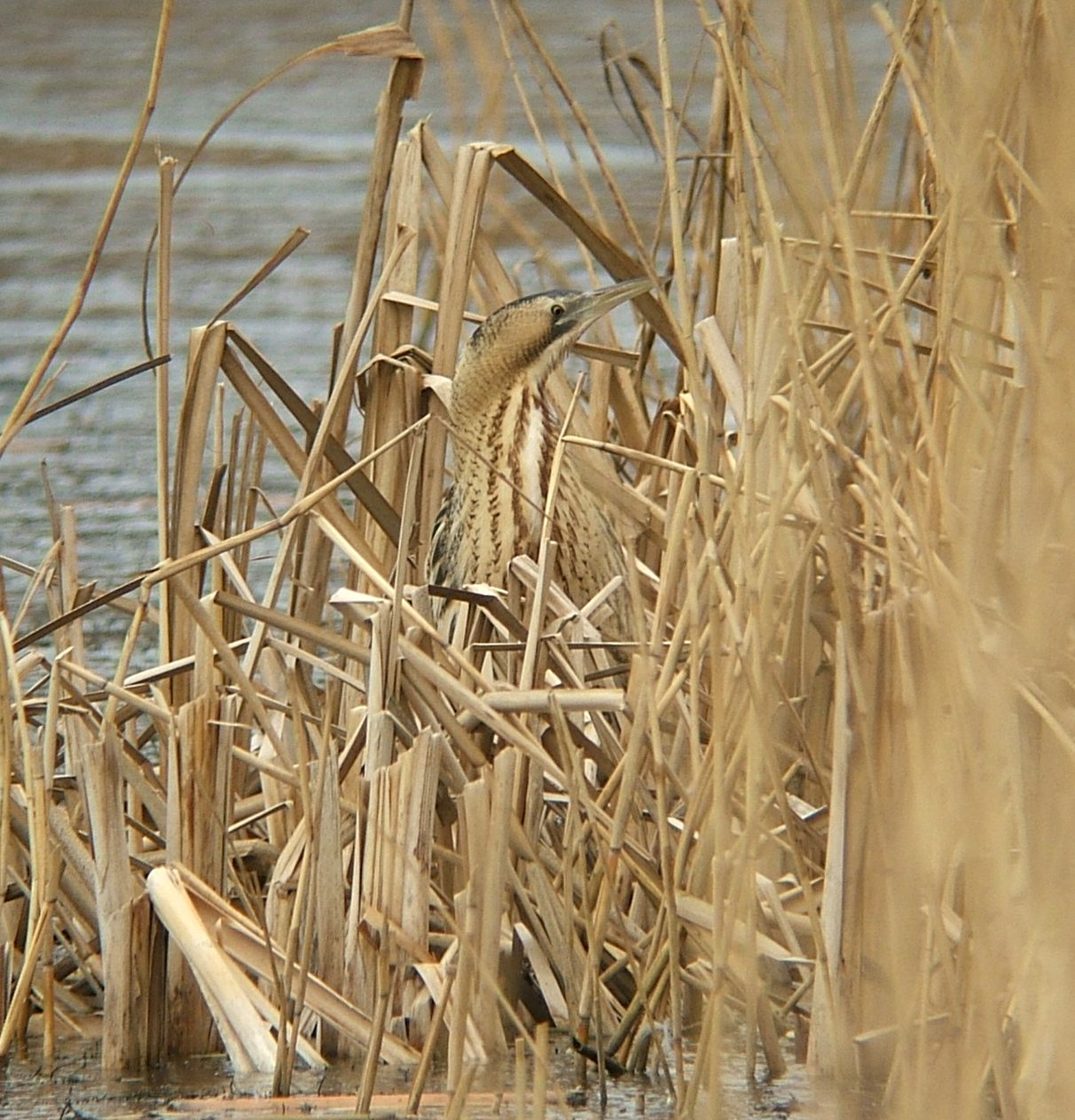
A bittern, well camouflaged in typical reed bed habitat

Some populations are sedentary and stay in the same areas throughout the year. More northerly populations usually migrate to warmer regions but some birds often remain; birds in northern Europe tend to move south and west to southern Europe, northern and central Africa, and northern Asian birds migrate to parts of the Arabian peninsula, the Indian sub-continent, and the provinces of Heilongjiang, Jilin and Inner Mongolia in eastern China. Outside the breeding season it has less restrictive habitat requirements, and as well as living in reed beds, it visits rice fields, watercress beds, fish farms, gravel pits, sewage works, ditches, flooded areas and marshes.

The subspecies B. s. capensis is endemic to southern Africa, where it is found sparingly in marshes near the east coast, the Okavango Delta and the upland foothills of the Drakensberg Mountains. This population is sedentary. In November 2024 it was seen in Wular Lake for the first time in The history of Kashmir.

== Behaviour ==
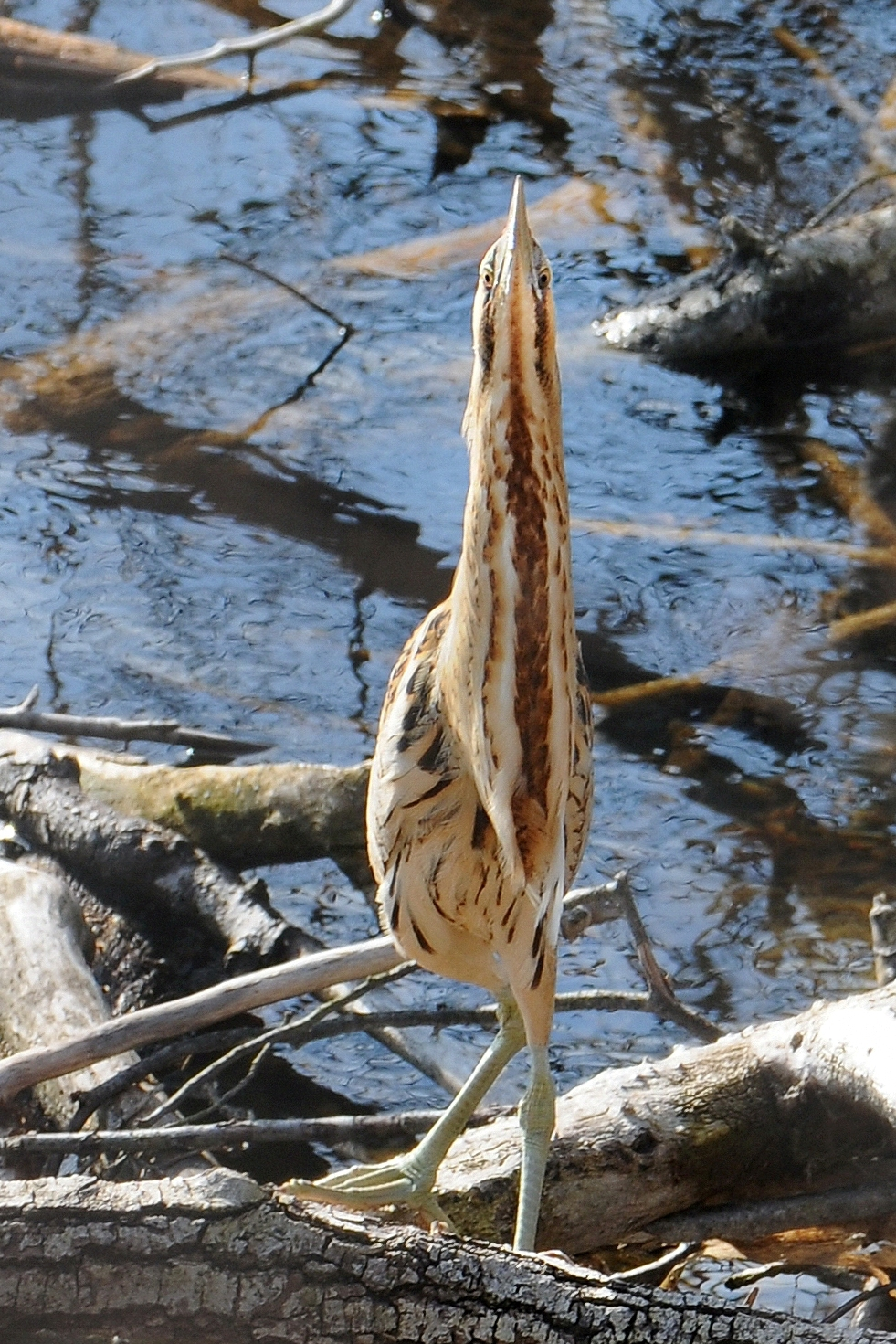
In defensive pose with elongated feathers spread

Usually solitary, the Eurasian bittern forages in reed beds, walking stealthily or remaining still above a body of water where prey may occur. It is a shy bird, and if disturbed, often points its bill directly upwards and freezes in that position, causing its cryptic plumage to blend into the surrounding reeds, an action known as bitterning. While in this position, the shield of elongated feathers on throat and breast droop downwards and hide the neck, so that the outline of the head and body is obscured. Sometimes it resorts to applying powder down produced by patches of specialist down feathers at the side of its breast. This white dusty material seems to help it to rid its head and neck of slime after feeding on eels. It then removes the excess powder by scratching vigorously before applying preen oil from the gland at the base of its tail.

The bird has a secretive nature, keeping largely hidden in the reeds and coarse vegetation. Occasionally, especially in hard winter weather, it stands in the open beside the water's edge, although usually close to cover to facilitate a hasty retreat. In flight, its wings can be seen to be broad and rounded, and its legs trail behind it in typical heron fashion. Its neck is extended when it takes off, but is retracted when it has picked up speed. It seldom flies however, except when feeding young, preferring to move through the vegetation stealthily on foot. Its gait is slow and deliberate and it can clamber over reeds by gripping several at a time with its toes. It is most active at dawn and dusk, but also sometimes forages by day.

fishing

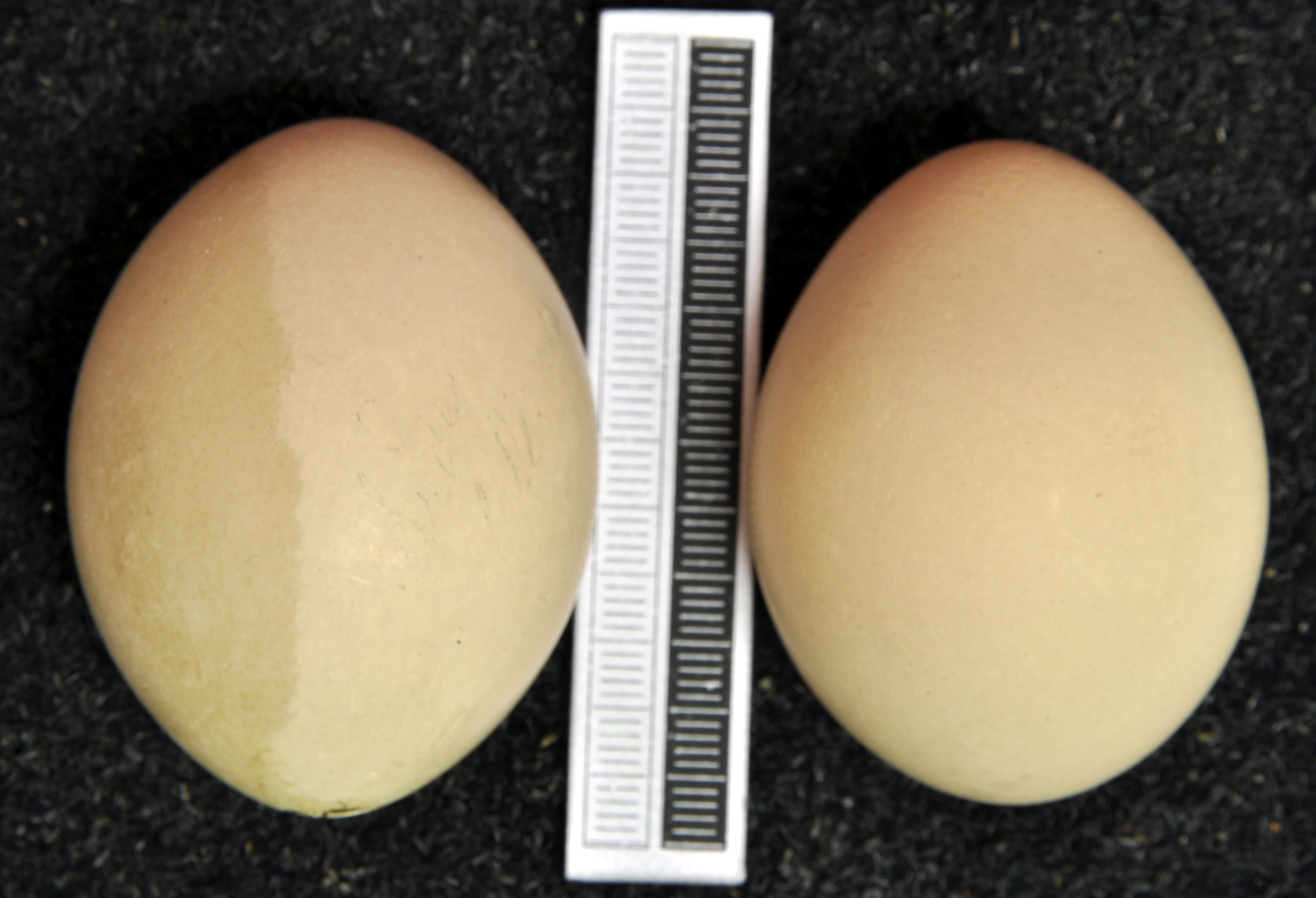
Eggs, Collection Museum Wiesbaden. Ruler is marked in millimeters.

Eurasian bitterns feed on fish, small mammals, birds and their nestlings, snakes, lizards, amphibians and invertebrates (such as worms, molluscs, crustaceans, spiders and insects), hunting along the reed margins in shallow water. British records include eels up to 35 cm (14 in) and other fish, mice and voles, small birds and fledglings, frogs, newts, crabs, shrimps, molluscs, spiders and insects. In continental Europe, members of over twenty families of beetle are eaten, as well as dragonflies, bees, grasshoppers and earwigs. Some vegetable matter such as aquatic plants is also consumed.

Males are polygamous, mating with up to five females. The nest is built in the previous year's standing reeds and consists of an untidy platform some 30 cm (12 in) across. It may be on a tussock surrounded by water or on matted roots close to water and is built by the female using bits of reed, sedges and grass stalks, with a lining of finer fragments. The eggs average 50 by 40 mm (2 by 1 1/2 in) in size and are non-glossy, olive-brown, with some darker speckling at the broader end. Four to six eggs are laid in late March and April and incubated by the female for about twenty-six days. After hatching, the chicks spend about two weeks in the nest before leaving to swim amongst the reeds. The female rears them without help from the male, regurgitating food into the nest from her crop, the young seizing her bill and pulling it down. They become fully fledged at about eight weeks.

=== Voice ===
Male booming

The mating call or contact call of the male is a deep, sighing fog-horn or bull-like boom with a quick rise and an only slightly longer fall, easily audible from a distance of five kilometres (three miles) on a calm night. The call is mainly given between January and April during the mating season. Surveys of Eurasian bitterns are carried out by noting the number of distinct male booms in a given area. Prior to modern science, it was unknown how such a small bird produced a call so low-pitched: common explanations included that the bird made its call into a straw or that it blew directly into the water. It is now known that the sound is produced by expelling air from the oesophagus with the aid of powerful muscles surrounding it.

The low, booming call is thought by some to be an explanation for the wailing of the banshee in Irish mythology, though the species is now (as of 2026) rare in Ireland.

=== Natural predators ===
Adult Eurasian bitterns do not have many natural predators except for large birds of prey, foxes and raccoon dogs. Juveniles and eggs, however, are at a greater risk of predation. Animals like otters, badgers, magpies, crows and harriers invade Eurasian bittern nests whenever an opportunity presents itself.

Invasive predators like the American mink and domestic dog are also a common cause for juvenile fatalities.

== Status ==
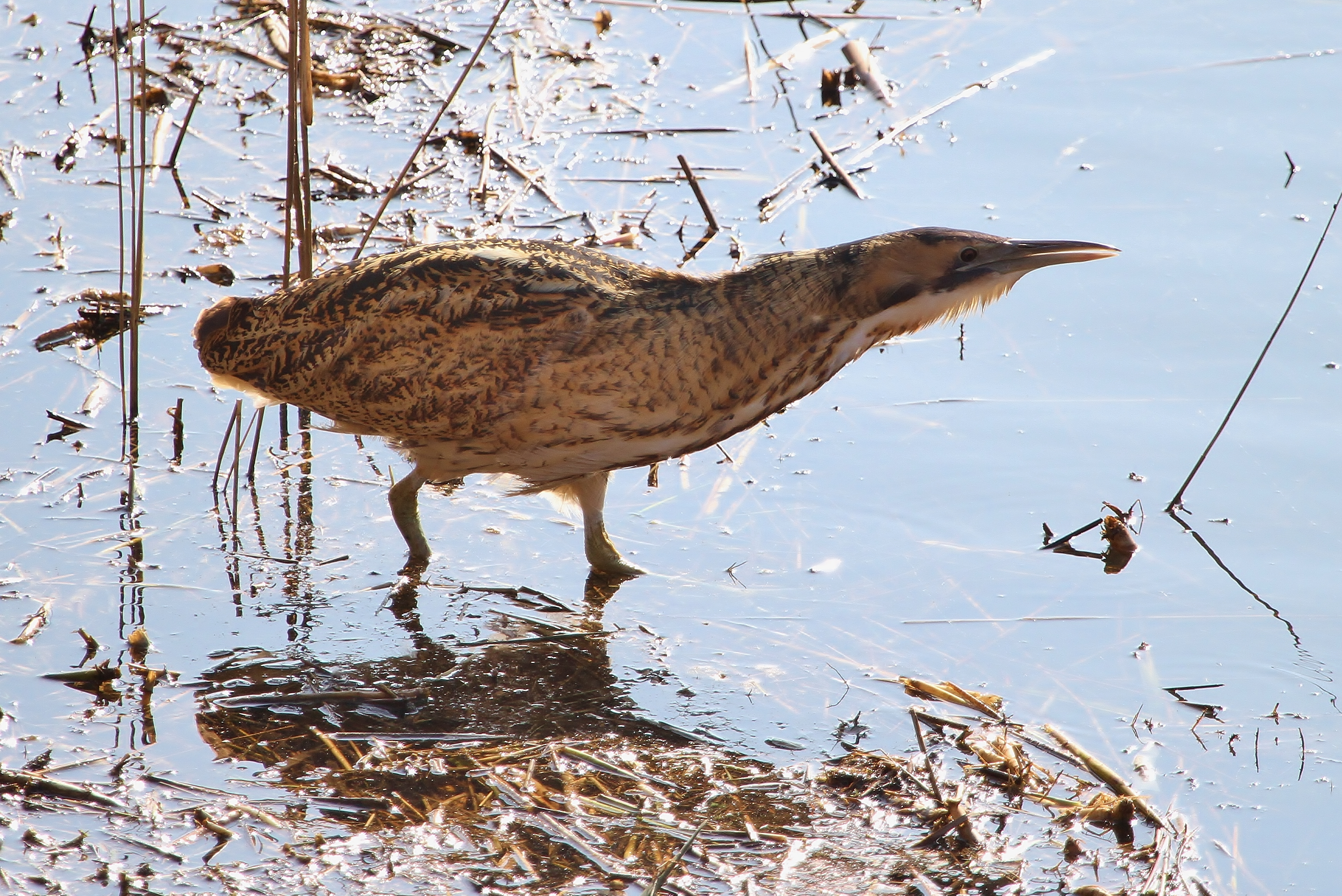
Foraging in shallow water

The Eurasian bittern has a very wide range and a large total population, estimated to be 110,000 to 340,000 individuals. The International Union for Conservation of Nature has assessed its overall conservation status as being of "least concern because although the population trend is downward, the rate of decline is insufficient to justify rating it in a more threatened category. The chief threat the bird faces is destruction of reed beds and drainage and disturbance of its wetland habitats. It is one of the species to which the Agreement on the Conservation of African-Eurasian Migratory Waterbirds (AEWA) applies. The southern race has suffered catastrophic decline during the 20th century due to wetland degradation and, unlike the northern race, is of high conservation concern.

In the United Kingdom the species became extinct in the late 1800s, and was not recorded to successfully breed again until 1911. The population increased to c.70 pairs in the 1950s, before dwindling to less than 20 pairs in the late 1990s. In 1997 there were 11 males and by 2007 an estimated 44 breeding pairs, concentrated mainly in Lancashire and East Anglia. In 2021, 228 breeding males were counted in the United Kingdom, an increase of 19 birds since 2019. The Lancashire population at Leighton Moss RSPB reserve declined in recent decades, while bitterns have been attracted to new reed beds in the West Country. After extensive reedbed restoration, nesting and breeding was observed in north Wales, while in 2020, two pairs successfully bred at Newport Wetlands in Gwent, south Wales. These were the first bitterns to breed in the county in some 250 years. In the 21st century, bitterns are regular winter visitors to the London Wetland Centre, enabling city dwellers to view these scarce birds. In Ireland, it died out as a breeding species in the mid-19th century, but in 2011 a single bird was spotted in County Wexford and there have been a number of subsequent sightings.

== In literature ==
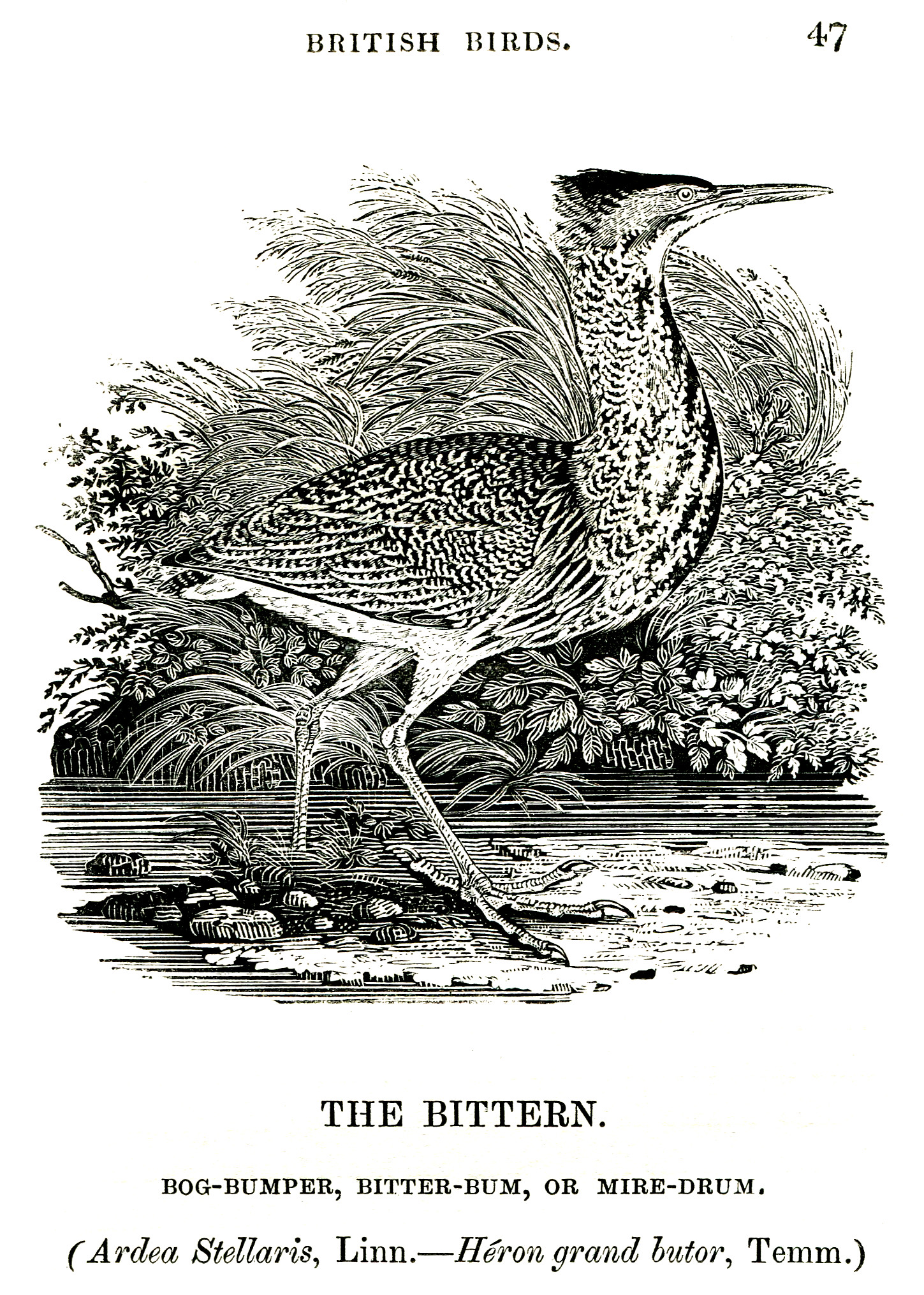
Wood engraving "The Bittern, Bog-Bumper, Bitter-Bum or Mire-Drum" from A History of British Birds, Volume 2, "Water Birds", by Thomas Bewick, 1804

Thomas Bewick records that the bittern "was formerly held in much estimation at the tables of the great".

=== Booming ===
The Eurasian bittern is proposed as one of rational explanations behind the drekavac, a creature of the graveyard and darkness originating in south Slavic mythology. It is mentioned in the short story "Brave Mita and Drekavac from the Pond" by Branko Ćopić.

The 18th-century Scottish poet James Thomson refers to the bittern's "boom" in his poem "Spring" (written 1728), published as part of his The Seasons (1735):

The Bittern knows the time, with bill ingulpht
To shake the sounding marsh

The species is mentioned in George Crabbe's 1810 narrative poem The Borough, to emphasise the ostracised, solitary life of the poem's villain, Peter Grimes:

And the loud Bittern from the bull-rush home
Gave from the Salt-ditch side the bellowing boom:

The Irish poet Thomas MacDonagh translated the Gaelic poem "The Yellow Bittern" ("An Bonnán Buí" in Irish) by Cathal Buí Mac Giolla Ghunna. His friend, the poet Francis Ledwidge, wrote a "Lament for Thomas MacDonagh" with the opening line "He shall not hear the bittern cry".

In the Sherlock Holmes novel The Hound of the Baskervilles by Sir Arthur Conan Doyle, the naturalist Stapleton proposes the boom of a bittern as an explanation for the howl attributed to the mystical hound.

Because of its secretive and skulking nature, it was for long unclear exactly how the bittern produced its distinctive booming call. A Mediaeval theory held that the bittern thrust its beak into the boggy ground of the marsh in which it lived, making its vocalization which was amplified and deepened as it reverberated through the water. A reference to this theory appears in 1476 in Chaucer's The Wife of Bath's Tale, lines 972-73:

And, as a bitore bombleth in the myre,
She leyde hir mouth un-to the water doun

The English 17th century physician Sir Thomas Browne disputed this claim, stating in his Pseudodoxia Epidemica, Book III, Ch.27: "That a Bittor maketh that mugient noise, or as we term it Bumping, by putting its bill into a reed as most believe, or as Bellonius and Aldrovandus conceive, by putting the same in water or mud, and after a while retaining the air by suddenly excluding it again, is not so easily made out. For my own part, though after diligent enquiry, I could never behold them in this motion". Browne even kept a captive bittern to discover how its "boom" was produced.

=== Camouflage ===
The artist Abbott Handerson Thayer argued in Concealing-Coloration in the Animal Kingdom that animals were concealed by a combination of countershading and disruptive coloration, which together "obliterated" their self-shadowing and their shape. However, Thayer's conclusions have been disputed.

The zoologist Hugh Cott, in his classic 1940 study of camouflage, Adaptive Coloration in Animals, cites William Palmer's account of seeing a bittern:

he once marked the place in a marsh where one of these birds had alighted: on reaching the spot he had the "greatest difficulty in finding it clinging motionless, with bill almost erect, to a stem of wild oats".
