= Krvavica =

Krvavica may refer to:

- Krvavica (hill), a rocky hill in Slovenia
- Krvavica, Croatia, a village in Baška Voda, Croatia
- Krvavica (Kruševac), a village in Kruševac, Serbia
- krvavica (крвавица), a type of blood sausage in Bosnia, Croatia and Serbia
- Krvavica (sausage), a blood sausage in Slovenia, similar to the kaszanka
