= Myling =

Scandinavian mythical creature

In Scandinavian folklore, the mylingar were the phantasmal incarnations of the souls of children that had been forced to roam the earth until they could persuade someone (or otherwise cause enough of a ruckus to make their wishes known) to bury them properly.

== Lore ==
The myling comes into existence when a child is unwanted and therefore killed by its mother. It can be heard singing in the night, thereby revealing the mother's crime. Ways to help the myling is to give it a name or to find the corpse and bury it in holy soil.

The myling (also known as utburd in Norwegian, útburður in Icelandic and ihtiriekko and liekkiö in Finnish) is said to chase lone wanderers at night and jump on their backs, demanding to be carried to the graveyard so they can rest in hallowed ground. Mylings are thought to be enormous and apparently grow heavier as they near the graveyard, to the point where any person carrying one (or more) could sink into the soil. If one should prove unable to make it into the cemetery, the myling kills its victim in a rage.

== History ==
The word "utburd" has a double meaning; the prefix "ut-" can mean both "out" and "extra" (similar to English uses of out- in outhouse & outcast vs outrun & outdone vs outbreak which carries both meanings); the Norwegian verb "burd" can mean "born/birth" and/or "burden" thus meaning "out-born/birth" and "extra-burden". The meaning "out-born/birth" refers to the practice of abandoning unwanted children (e.g., children born out of wedlock or to parents who lacked the means to care for them) in the woods or in other remote places where death is likely to befall the child. In the 17th and 18th century, a child born out of wedlock was seen as unacceptable. Most death sentences meted out to women in Sweden during this time was due to infanticide.

It is believed that the ghost of the child will then haunt the place where they had died or, as told of in countless stories, the dwellings of their killers. The "extra-burden" meaning could also explain the motif or trope of the myling or utburd getting heavier as they're carried to hallowed ground to be buried.

"Myling" means Murderling "a murdered small child" and also "small child that murders" from Old Norse myrþa meaning "to murder" with the suffix -ling meaning "small child" in this case. This offers an explanation to the stories of the Myling being murdered and murdering.

This infanticide was generally carried out secretly and its victims were often abandoned shortly after birth. From the perspective of certain Christian denominations, the babies were thus denied baptism, acceptance into the Church, and proper burial. As such, they could not rest peacefully.

In order to stop a dead child from becoming a myling, women would put scissors on its chest. This, however, did not help. The only true remedy was said to be burial in consecrated soil. But since they also needed a name, they would still cry out to passer-bys: "Give me a name!" If a passer-by then replied: "You can take mine", the myling would finally find peace.

The belief that mylings are enraged and seeking revenge is what gave them the reputation as one of the most menacing types of ghosts in Scandinavian folklore.

== In popular culture ==
In the debut album of heavy metal band Wince and Frisson, mylingar are the subject of their lead off single, Kärrhäxan. A music video artfully detailing the murder of and rebirth of a newborn as a myling was painstakingly animated and edited by band members.

In the mobile game Year Walk, part of the game is spent finding lost Mylings to put in the care of the Brook Horse.

In the subsequent Year Walk: Bedtime Stories for Awful Children, the third chapter is devoted to the Mylings.

In the PC game Phasmophobia where you take the role of a ghost hunter, one of the possible ghosts you may encounter is a Myling.

== See also ==
- Bukavac
- Drekavac
- Konaki-jiji (Japanese "Myling")
- Poroniec
- Wiedergänger

== Sources ==
- af Klintberg, Bengt (2010). "Death and the Dead". The Types of the Swedish Folk Legend. Helsinki: Academia Scientiarum Fennica. pp. 81–85. ISBN 9789514110535. SELIBR 12098688.
- Kvideland, Reimund; Sehmsdorf, Henning K. (1988). Scandinavian Folk Belief and Legend. The Nordic Series. Vol. 14. Oslo: Norwegian University Press. pp. 113–118. ISBN 978-82-00-02638-9. SELIBR 7166116.
- Pentikäinen, Juha (1989). Simpson, Elizabeth; Sehmsdorf, Henning K.; Kvideland, Reimund (eds.). Nordic folklore: recent studies. Folklore studies in translation, 99-0588351-7. Bloomington, Ind.: Indiana Univ. press. pp. 128–136. ISBN 978-0-253-33125-0. SELIBR 4733374.
- Pentikäinen, Juha (1968). The Nordic dead-child tradition: Nordic dead-child beings : a study in comparative religion. FF communications, 0014-5815; 202. Helsinki. SELIBR 8151831.
- Simpson, Jacqueline, ed. (1988). Scandinavian folktales. Penguin folklore library. London: Penguin. ISBN 978-0-14-059505-5. SELIBR 4581479.
