= Poroniec =

Slavic demon

A poroniec ([ˈpɔrɔɲɛt͡s]; plural porońce) is a hostile and malicious demon from Slavic mythology. They were believed to come into existence from stillborn fetuses, but also from improperly buried remains of children who had died during infancy.

== Folklore ==
A poroniec is somewhat similar to a being from Scandinavian folklore, the myling. Porońce were considered to be extremely powerful demons, due to their potential of unrealized life.

Porońce were associated with many taboos regarding pregnant women, such as drawing water from a well, leaving home with an infant, or engaging in sexual intercourse.

A stillborn fetus did not turn into a poroniec if it was buried under the threshold of the house. Instead, it turned into a kłobuk – a protective house spirit.

== In popular culture ==
- In the 2015 video game The Witcher 3: Wild Hunt, one of the main quests revolves around the search for a botchling (poroniec in the original version) that can be killed or turned into a lubberkin (kłobuk).

== See also ==
- Drekavac (the South Slavic equivalent)
- Myling
- Pontianak
- Konaki-jiji
