= Priests Ćira and Spira =

- Directed by: Soja Jovanović
- Written by: Rodoljub Andrić; Soja Jovanović; Stevan Sremac (Novel)
- Starring: Ljubinka Bobić; Nevenka Mikulić; Jovan Gec; Milan Ajvaz; Renata Ulmanski; Dubravka Perić; Slobodan Perović
- Cinematography: Nenad Jovičić
- Edited by: Milanka Nanović
- Music by: Borivoje Simić
- Release date: 1957
- Running time: 82 minutes
- Country: Yugoslavia
- Language: Serbo-Croatian

Priests Ćira and Spira (Serbo-Croatian: Pop Ćira i pop Spira) is a 1957 Yugoslav film directed by Soja Jovanović. It was based on Pop Ćira i pop Spira, an 1894 novel by Stevan Sremac. It was the first Yugoslav feature film made in color.

== Cast ==
- Ljubinka Bobić as Popadija Sida
- Nevenka Mikulić as Popadija Persa
- Jovan Gec as Pop Spira
- Milan Ajvaz as Pop Ćira
- Renata Ulmanski as kćerka pop Spire
- Dubravka Perić as kćerka pop Ćire
- Ljubiša Jovanović as pop Oluja
