= Hašani =

Hašani Хашани
- Village
- Location within Bosnia and Herzegovina
- Coordinates: 44.831479°N 16.349266°E
- Country: Bosnia and Herzegovina
- Entity: Republika Srpska
- Municipality: Krupa na Uni

Area
  - Total: 4.78 sq mi (12.37 km^{2})

Population (2013)
  - Total: 211
- Time zone: UTC+1 (CET)
  - Summer (DST): UTC+2 (CEST)

Hašani (Serbian Cyrillic: Хашани) is a village in the municipality of Krupa na Uni, Republika Srpska, Bosnia and Herzegovina. It is the birthplace of writer Branko Ćopić.

Before the Bosnian War, the entire town of Hašani was part of the Bosanska Krupa municipality, but after the Dayton Peace Agreement one part of the inhabited area became a part of municipality Krupa na Uni, divided by the Inter-Entity Boundary Line.

== Demographics ==
According to the 1991 Yugoslav census, the village had 414 inhabitants, all of them being ethnic Serbs. According to the 2013 census, the village had either 217 inhabitants or 211.
