= Bukavac =

Demonic creature from Serbian Mythology

Bukavac (Serbo-Croatian pronunciation: [bǔːkaʋat͡s]) is a demonic mythical creature in Slavic mythology. Belief in it existed in Syrmia.

Bukavac was sometimes imagined as a six-legged monster with gnarled horns and bright blue eyes. It lives in lakes and pools, coming out of the water during the night to make a loud noise (hence the name: buka – noise). It would jump onto people and animals and strangle them.

== See also ==
- Drekavac
- Myling
