= Eagles Fly Early (film) =

- Directed by: Soja Jovanović
- Based on: Eagles Fly Early by Branko Ćopić
- Starring: Čkalja; Pavle Jovanović
- Release date: 1 March 1966
- Running time: 1h 31min
- Country: Yugoslavia
- Language: Serbo-Croatian

Eagles Fly Early (Serbo-Croatian: Orlovi rano lete / Орлови рано лете) is a 1966 Yugoslav adventure film based on the eponymous novel by Branko Ćopić.

== Cast ==
- Čkalja - Poljar Lijan
- Pavle Jovanović - Jovanče
- Ljubče Popović - Lazar Mačak
