= Branislav Nušić =

Serbian playwright (1864–1938)

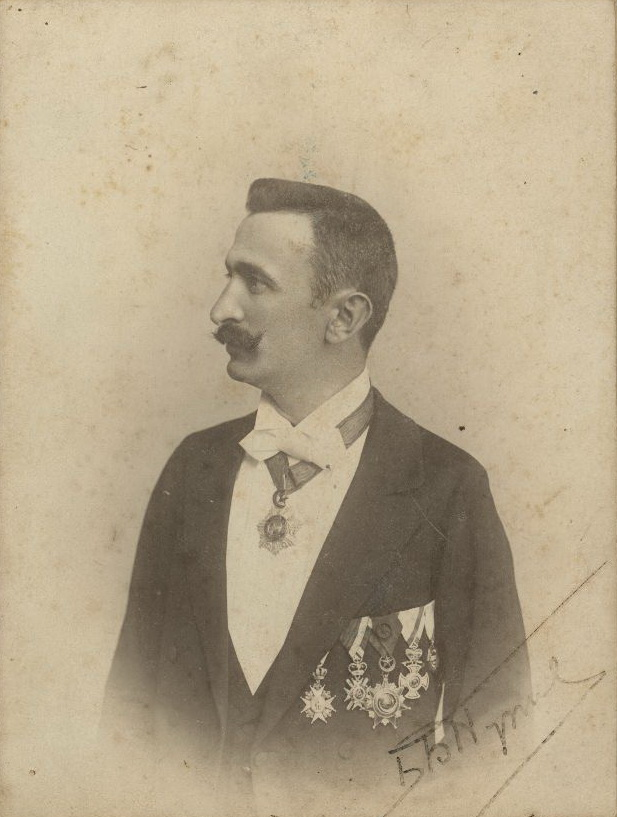
- Nušić in a 1900 photo taken by his godfather and photographer Milan Jovanović.
- Born: Alkibijad Nuša; 20 October [O.S. 8 October] 1864; Belgrade, Principality of Serbia
- Died: 19 January 1938 (aged 73); Belgrade, Kingdom of Yugoslavia
- Occupation: Playwright • satirist • essayist • novelist
- Writing career
- Language: Serbian

Signature
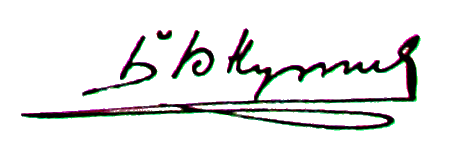

Branislav Nušić (Serbian Cyrillic: Бранислав Нушић, pronounced [brǎnislav̞ nûʃit͡ɕ]; 20 October [O.S. 8 October] 1864 – 19 January 1938) was a Serbian playwright, satirist, essayist, novelist. Nušić was the founder of modern rhetoric in Serbia. He also worked as a journalist and a civil servant.

== Life ==
Branislav Nušić was born Alkibijad Nuša (Aromanian: Alchiviadi al Nusha, Greek: Αλκιβιάδης Νούσας, romanized: Alcibiades Nousas) in Belgrade on 20 October [O.S. 8 October] 1864. His father, George Nousias (Thessaloniki, 1822 – Priština, 1916), was a Serbianized Aromanian merchant whose family had its roots in the village of Magarevo in then Ottoman Macedonia, while his mother, Ljubica (Brčko, 1839 – Belgrade, 1904), was a Serb homemaker from Bosnia, then under Austro-Hungarian rule.

Young Alkibijad completed his primary education in Smederevo, a port town along the Danube, before returning to Belgrade to complete his secondary education. In 1882, at the age of 18, he legally changed his name to Branislav Nušić. He subsequently enrolled in the Belgrade Higher School, graduating with a law degree in 1885. That year, at the age of 21, he was conscripted into the Royal Serbian Army. Nušić's service coincided with the two-week-long Serbo-Bulgarian War of November 1885, which he witnessed first-hand as a Serbian corporal in western Bulgaria.

Nušić was quick to criticize the conduct of the Serbian Supreme Command during the war, which ended in a Bulgarian victory. He outlined his objections in the book Pripovetke jednog kaplara iz srpsko–bugarskog rata 1885 (The Stories of a Corporal from the Serbo–Bulgarian War of 1885), which was published in 1886. He went on to spend one years' study at the University of Graz in Austria-Hungary. In 1887, Nušić published a poem titled Dva raba ("Two Servants"), which ridiculed the Serbian King Milan for attending the funeral of an unpopular general's mother rather than that of Mihailo Katanić, an officer who died of wounds sustained while saving his regiment's flag. Nušić was subsequently arrested, convicted of lèse-majesté and sentenced to two years imprisonment. He served his sentence at a prison in Požarevac but was released after only one year due to good behaviour.

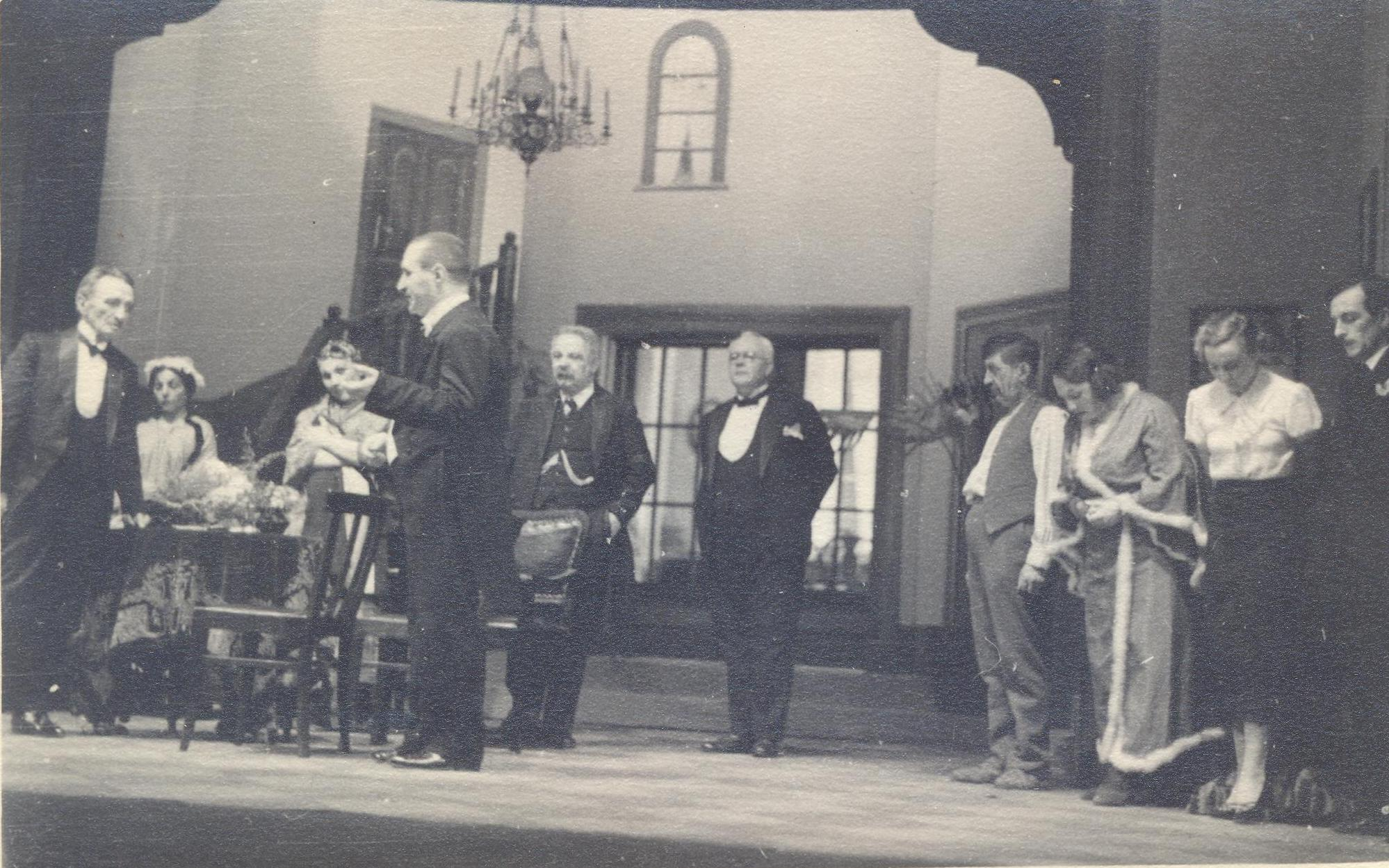
Nušić (far left) visiting Bulgaria in 1935.

In 1889, shortly after his release from prison, Nušić entered the civil service as an official in Serbia's Ministry of Foreign Affairs. Several years later, in 1893, he married Darinka Đorđević, the 17-year-old niece of the Serbian consul in Bitola, Dimitrije Bodi. The couple had three children, one of whom died in infancy. Between 1889 and 1900, Nušić worked as a clerk at the Serbian consulates to the Ottoman Empire in Bitola, Serres, Thessaloniki, Skopje, and Pristina. Despite his earlier anti-war rhetoric, Nušić became an enthusiastic supporter of using military means to force the Ottoman Empire out from the Balkans. In 1900, he received a post at the Ministry of Education. Shortly thereafter, he became the head dramaturgist of the National Theatre in Belgrade. In 1904, he was appointed head of the Serbian National Theatre in Novi Sad. In 1905, he left his new post and moved to Belgrade to work as a journalist. He also worked as an editor for various magazines and feuilletonist for Politika, writing under the pseudonym Ben Akiba.

Following Austria-Hungary's annexation of Bosnia and Herzegovina in October 1908, Nušić led a series of anti-Habsburg demonstrations in Belgrade. He climbed a balcony at the National Theatre, railed against the "plunder" of Serbian lands by Austria-Hungary, and demanded immediate military action. He subsequently rode his horse into the Ministry of Foreign Affairs, to the consternation of Prime Minister Nikola Pašić. The popularity of Nušić's works, as well as those of fellow dramatist Petar Kočić, increased dramatically following the annexation. In 1912, Nušić returned to Bitola as a civil servant. Macedonia was captured and annexed by Serbia following the First Balkan War, and in February 1913, Nušić was appointed prefect of Bitola. He was quickly forced to resign after consistently failing to adhere to the demands of the Black Hand and the ultra-nationalist guerilla bands that formed the backbone of the Royal Serbian Army's occupation force. Despite this, he remained in Skopje, and helped establish the city's first theatre in 1913. The outbreak of World War I brought further personal tragedies Nušić's way; his son Strahinja was killed on the frontline while serving in the Serbian Army. Nušić lived in Skopje until November 1915, when Austria-Hungary, Germany and Bulgaria successfully invaded and occupied Serbia. He took part in the Serbian army's retreat through Albania between November 1915 and February 1916. He lived in Italy, Switzerland and France until the end of the war.

Nušić returned to Serbia a broken man, devastated by the loss of his only son. He was appointed to be the first head of the Ministry of Education's art department, serving alongside the writers Borisav Stanković and Stanislav Vinaver. He also became the first post-war director of the theatre in Skopje. He remained at this post until 1923. Afterwards, he was appointed head of the Sarajevo National Theatre. In Sarajevo, Nušić wrote Ramazanske noći (Nights of Ramadan) under the pseudonym Halil Delibašić. He returned to Belgrade in 1927. In Vienna, he acted in the film Paramount Review in 1930. Nušić became a member of the Serbian Royal Academy in 1933. Following The Bereaved Family's 1935 premiere in Sofia, he received a medal from the Bulgarian state. He was also awarded Order of Saint Sava, Order of the White Eagle and Order of Prince Danilo I. Nušić died in Belgrade on 19 January 1938.

== Social criticism ==
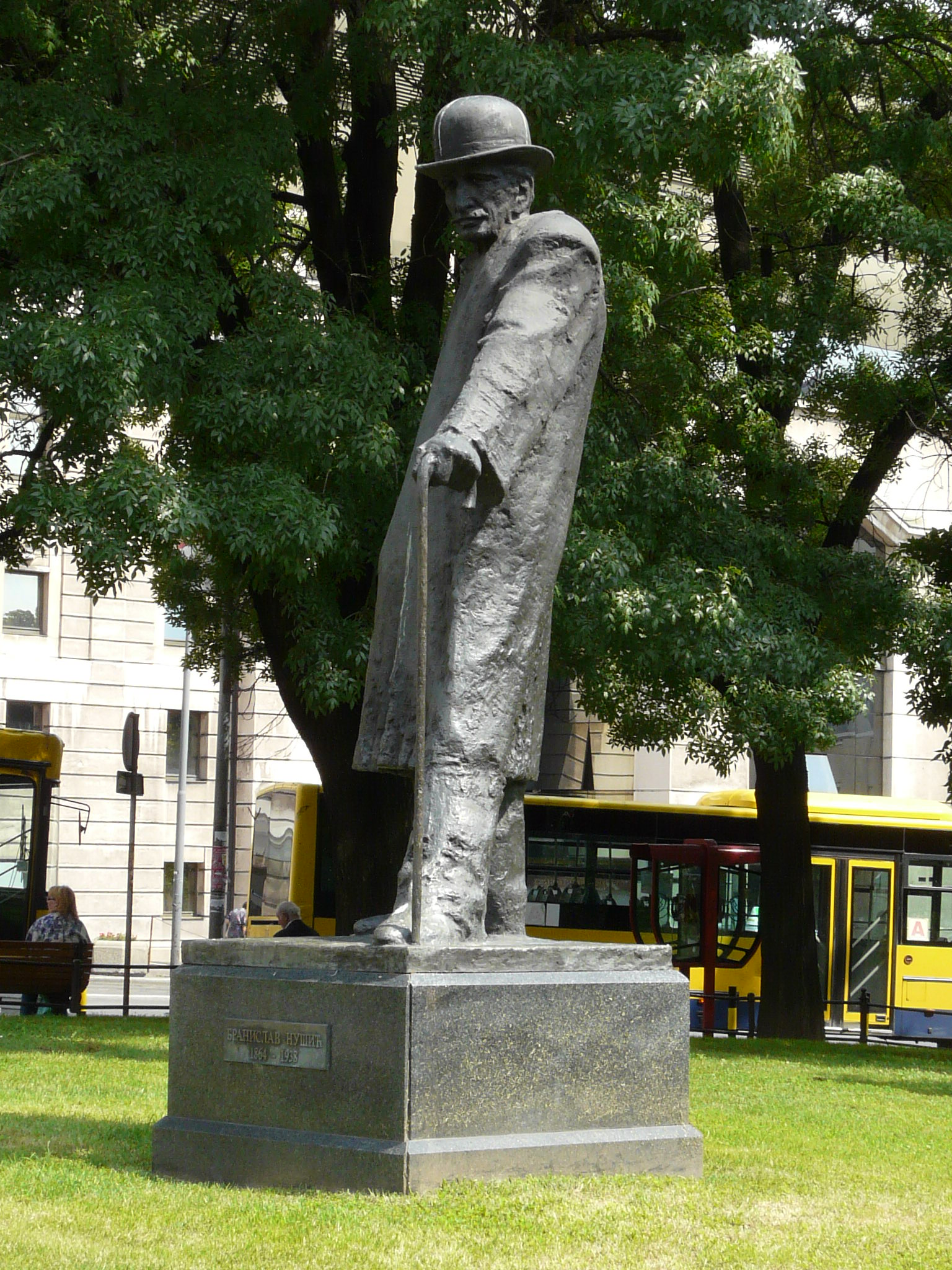
Nušić Monument in Belgrade.

Nušić is more celebrated as a playwright than as a novelist. His incidental novels and journalistic feuilletons are not always moralistic or polished, but they are lively and amusing sketches of life. He is more prolific in historical drama and comedy. Nušić's ability to blend humor with a biting critque of society ensures that his plays remain relevant and appreciated. Of his plays, the most popular are comedies The Cabinet Minister's Wife (Госпођа министарка), A Suspicious Person (Сумњиво лице), A Member of the Parliament (Народни посланик), Bereaved Family (Ожалошћена породица), The Deceased (Покојник), and Doctor (Др).

Through his plays, Nušić presented Serbian society and the mentality of the middle class in small towns and counties. He brought to the stage not only the retailers, canton captains, semi-educated officers, and current and former ministers' wives, but also formerly distinguished and overly ambitious householders, their decadent sons, failed students, distinguished daughters of marriageable age, and greedy upstarts.

All-in-all he depicted the Serbian middle class and its morality, which managed to survive despite all the political and social reforms, newly formed educational system and cultural institutions. He also paid special attention to the social conditions of their origins, as they started out with unrealizable desires and insatiable appetites, the distorted family and marital relationships, misunderstandings and intolerance between fathers and sons, unfaithful husbands and wives, officers’ ignorance and corruption and unreal political ambitions. Nušić thus became not only a playwright, observer and interpreter of his time, but also an analyst of Serbian society and its mentality at a specific historical period.

== Selected works ==
Some of Nušić's major works (with English translation of titles):

=== Comedies ===
- Народни посланик (A Member of the Parliament) (1885)
- Сумњиво лице (A Suspicious Person) (1887)
- Протекција (Favoritism) (1889)
- Обичан човек (An Ordinary Man ) (1899)
- Свет (The Publicity) (1906)
- Пут око света (Travel Around the World) (1910)
- Госпођа министарка (The Cabinet Minister's Wife) (1929)
- Мистер Долар (Mister Dollar) (1932)
- Ујеж (SYEW - Society of Yugoslav Emancipated Women) (1933)
- Ожалошћена породица (Bereaved Family) (1934)
- Др (PhD) (1936)
- Покојник (The Deceased) (1937)
- Власт (unfinished) (Authority)
- Ђоле кермит (unfinished)

=== Dramas ===
- Тако је морало бити (It Had to Be This Way) (1902)
- Јесења киша (Autumn Rain)
- Иза Божјих леђа (Behind God's Back)
- Пучина (Offing) (1902)
- Кирија (Rental Fee)

=== Novels ===
- Општинско дете (County's Child), published in Sarajevo as Опћинско дијете (1902)
- Хајдуци (Hajduks) (1933)
- Деветстопетнаеста (915th)
- Аутобиографија (Autobiography) (1924)

=== Short stories ===
- Политички противник (Political Rival)
- Посмртно слово (Eulogy)
- Класа (Class)
- Приповетке једног каплара (The Corporal's Stories) (1886)

=== Tragedies ===
- Кнез Иво од Семберије (Prince Ivo of Semberia)
- Хаџи-Лоја
- Наход (Foundling)

=== Other ===
- Рамазанске вечери (Ramadan Nights) (1898)
- Реторика (a discourse on rhetoric) (1934)

== In popular culture ==
- A Member of the Parliament, a film based on the comedie from 1885 of Branislav Nusic and directed by Stole Janković, was produced in 1964 by the Bosna Film.
- A Member of the Parliament (remake), a television film based on the comedie of Branislav Nusic and directed by Slavenko Saletović, was produced in 1990 by the broadcasting service RTB.
- A Suspicious Person, a film based on the comedie from 1887 of Branislav Nusic and directed by Soja Jovanović, was produced in 1954 by the Avala Film.
- A Suspicious Person (remake), a television film based on the comedie of Branislav Nusic and directed by Arsa Milosevic, was produced in 1989 by the broadcasting service RTB.
- The Cabinet Minister's Wife, a film based on the comedie from 1929 of Branislav Nusic and directed by Žorž Skrigin, was produced in 1958 by the UFUS.
- The Cabinet Minister's Wife (remake), a television film based on the comedie of Branislav Nusic and directed by Zdravko Šotra, was produced in 1989 by the broadcasting service RTB.
- Bereaved Family, a television film based on the comedie from 1935 was produced in 1960 by the broadcasting service RTB.
- Bereaved Family (remake), a television film based on the comedie of Branislav Nusic and directed by Milan Karadzic, was produced in 1990 by the broadcasting service RTB.
- Travel Around the World, a film based on the comedie from 1910 of Branislav Nusic and directed by Soja Jovanović, was produced in 1964 by the Avala Film.
- In 2011 TV film Albatross, Branislav Nušić was portrayed by actor Milan Vranešević.
- Nušićijada, annual comedy festival inaugurated in 1968, bears the name of Branislav Nušić
