= Pop Ćira i pop Spira =

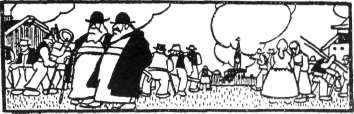
Illustration from the original work.

Pop Ćira i pop Spira (Serbian Cyrillic: Поп Ћира и поп Спира; "priest Ćira and priest Spiro") is an 1894 novel by Stevan Sremac. The novel was adapted into film in Priests Ćira and Spira (1957).
