= Ljubiša Jovanović =

Serbian actor

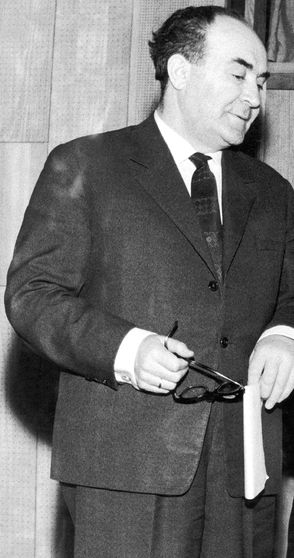
- Born: 1 October 1908; Šabac, Kingdom of Serbia
- Died: 15 July 1971 (aged 62); Belgrade, SFR Yugoslavia
- Occupation: Actor
- Years active: 1946–1970

Ljubiša Jovanović (1 October 1908 – 15 July 1971) was a Serbian actor who appeared in more than forty films from 1946 to 1970.

== Selected filmography ==
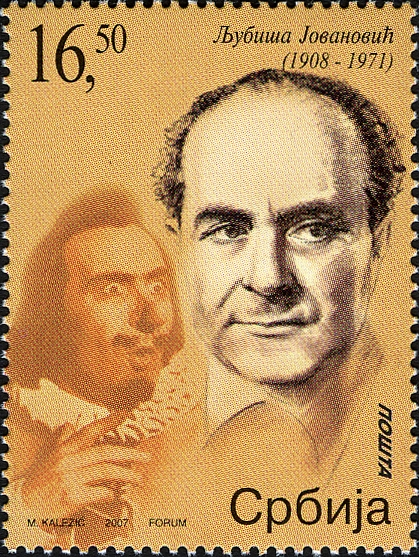
Jovanović on Serbian stamp

Year	Title	Role	Notes
1946	In the Mountains of Yugoslavia	Janko	
1950	The Magic Sword		
1957	Priests Ćira and Spira		
1960	Atomic War Bride		
1964	March on the Drina	General Stepa Stepanović	
