= Soja Jovanović =

Serbian film director (1922–2002)

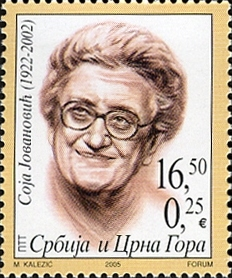
- Jovanović on a 2005 Serbia and Montenegro postage stamp.
- Born: Sofija Jovanović; 1 February 1922; Belgrade, Kingdom of Serbs, Croats and Slovenes
- Died: 22 April 2002 (aged 80); Belgrade, FR Yugoslavia
- Years active: 1954–1982
- Awards: Golden Arena for Best Director; 1957 Priests Ćira and Spira

Sofija "Soja" Jovanović (Serbian Cyrillic: Соја Јовановић, pronounced [sɔ̌fija sɔ̌ːja jɔv̞ǎːnɔv̞it͡ɕ]; 1 February 1922 – 22 April 2002) was the first Serbian and Yugoslav female film director, noted for her work in theater, TV and film productions.

== Biography ==
After studying at the Theater Department of the Belgrade Music Academy, her first success was the stage production of Branislav Nušić's play A Suspicious Character (Serbian: Sumnjivo lice) in 1948, for which she was awarded at the Festival of Academy Theaters of Yugoslavia. Apart from theater productions, she also directed a number of films, mostly based on comedies written by Branislav Nušić, Jovan Sterija Popović, Stevan Sremac and Branko Ćopić.

Her first film was A Suspicious Character in 1954 which she co-directed with Predrag Dinulović. In 1957 she directed Priests Ćira and Spira, which was the first Yugoslavian feature film shot in color and for which she won the Golden Arena for Best Director at the 1957 Pula Film Festival. She also directed a number of TV films and radio dramas produced by Radio Television Belgrade until the early 1980s when she retired.

== Filmography ==
- A Suspicious Character (Sumnjivo lice, 1954)
- Priests Ćira and Spira (Pop Ćira i pop Spira, 1957)
- The Dreams Came by Coach (Diližansa snova, 1960)
- Dr (1962)
- Put oko sveta (1964)
- Eagles Fly Early (Orlovi rano lete, 1966)
- Pusti snovi (1968)
- Silom otac (1969)
