= Nušićijada =

Comedy festival

Nušićijada Нушићијада
- Official logo
- Genre: Comedy festival
- Dates: Last week of August; 25–27 August 2023
- Frequency: Annually
- Locations: Ivanjica, Serbia
- Years active: 1967–1972; 2010–present
- Inaugurated: 1967; 59 years ago
- Attendance: 100,000 (2023)
- Organiser: Ivanjica Municipality; Ivanjica Culture Centre; Ivanjica Tourism Organisation
- Website: nusicijadaivanjica.rs

Nušićijada is an annual comedy festival held in the town of Ivanjica, in the Moravica region of southwestern Serbia.

== History ==
1967–1972

The festival was founded in 1967 under the name "September in Ivanjica" (Serbian Cyrillic: Септембар у Ивањици). It was organized on the initiative of Radovan Vasović, and it was envisioned as the festival of affirmation of large socialist companies which operated in Ivanjica.

In the following year, the festival changed name to "Nušićijada" and ran as a celebration of film comedy from 1968 to 1972, which attracted the cultural elite of then Yugoslavia. The festival had a Round Scene with a Corner. The festival bears the name of the famous Serbian comedy playwright, Branislav Nušić, who used the sentence "You’re bound for Ivanjica!" as a punchline in his comedies, indicating the 19th century threat of exile to this town. Later it became the festival's slogan and the invitation to Ivanjica. In 1972, the festival ended.

2010–2018

2010–2018 Nušićijada logo

In 2008, a citizen petition to revive the festival was signed by over 10% of the population. A citizen organization named KudeS (Cultural Decentralization of Serbia) was formed and led the process of organizing the new festival. After the local Assembly adopted the proposal, the Municipality of Ivanjica, Ivanjica Culture Centre and Ivanjica Tourism Organisation joined the partnership, and these four organizations organised Nušićijada beginning in 2010.

According to the organizers, the 2015 Nušićijada attracted more than 55,000 visitors, the highest number since its founding. The 2016 Nušićijada again attracted 55,000 visitors.

2018–present

In March 2018, the municipality's president and the local leader of ruling Serbian Progressive Party made a decision to expel KudeS (the leader of the festival's revival and its main organizer) from the list of event's organizers. The move was widely seen as politically motivated, as the event's former participants have satirically mocked the President of Serbia and leader of the Serbian Progressive Party Aleksandar Vučić.
