= Eagles Fly Early (novel) =

1959 children's novel by Branko Ćopić

Orlovi Rano Lete
- Author: Branko Ćopić
- Language: Serbian
- Genre: Adventure, Comedy
- Publication date: 1959
- Publication place: Yugoslavia
- Media type: Print (Hardcover & Paperback)
- Pages: 240
- ISBN: 86-7781-194-X

Orlovi rano lete (Eagles Fly Early) is a Yugoslavian children's novel written by Branko Ćopić and published in 1959. It was made into a film in 1966.

== Synopsis ==
The book involves several young boys and a girl and their role in assisting the Partisans in fighting the Croatian fascists Ustaše invading Yugoslavia during World War II. There are allusions throughout to mythology such as the drekavac, a monster which the children are told lives in the forest. The children are forced to conquer their superstitious fear in order to assist the Partisans.

The book is divided in two parts. The first part is before the war in Yugoslavia, and the second is about the children helping the Partisans in fighting against fascists in World War II.

== See also ==
- Branko Ćopić
