= Krvavica (Kruševac) =

- Village
- Location within Serbia
- Coordinates: 43°38′42″N 21°15′17″E
- Country: Serbia
- District: Rasina District
- Municipality: Kruševac

Population (2002)
  - Total: 862
- Time zone: UTC+1 (CET)
  - Summer (DST): UTC+2 (CEST)

Krvavica is a village in the municipality of Kruševac, Serbia. According to the 2002 census, the village has a population of 862 people.
