= Konaki-jiji =

Yōkai

Konaki-jiji (子泣き爺; also romanized konaki-jijii or konakijijii) is a yōkai — a supernatural creature from Japanese folklore — originating in the mountain regions of Tokushima Prefecture on the island of Shikoku. The name is typically translated as "old man crying like a baby" or "baby-crying old man," combining ko naki (子泣き, "child crying") with jijii (爺, "old man"). It is one of the most widely recognized yōkai in Japan, documented in major folklorist compilations, depicted visually for the first time by manga artist Shigeru Mizuki, and featured across decades of Japanese popular culture.

The konaki-jiji is notable for its deceptive method of attack: it lures compassionate travelers by mimicking the sound of an infant crying in the wilderness, then, once picked up, becomes supernaturally heavy, crushing its victim to death.

== Name and etymology ==
The kanji rendering 子泣き爺 breaks down as:

子 (ko) — child

泣き (naki) — crying

爺 (jijii) — old man, grandfather

An alternate kanji form, 児啼爺, uses ji (児, infant) in place of ko, foregrounding the creature's infantile cry rather than its origin as a child spirit. The name is sometimes written in hiragana as 子泣きじじい to emphasize the elongated vowel of jijii. Regional oral traditions in the mountainous areas of Shikoku may feature slight phonetic variants, though the standard form became fixed after the yokai was documented in early 20th-century folklore scholarship.

== Description ==
The Konaki-jiji is said to be able to take the appearance of an old man or a baby. In either case, the spirit lures an unwary passerby towards it and allows him or her to pick it up. After the spirit is picked up, it suddenly becomes a heavy stone that crushes the victim to death. In some versions of Konaki-jiji stories, the spirit is that of a baby left to die in the wilderness.

The Konaki-jiji can be traced back to family records in Shikoku where the term was used to describe an old man who sounded like a child when he cried. The term was eventually used in a national encyclopedia of yōkai and became a nationally known phenomenon.

== In popular culture ==
In the manga series Dandadan, the spirit known as onbusuman is based on the Konaki-jiji. In the manga it appears as a creature with the large head of an old man, the shell of a turtle, the arms and legs of an infant and a long hairy tail.
