= Branko Ćopić =

Yugoslav writer

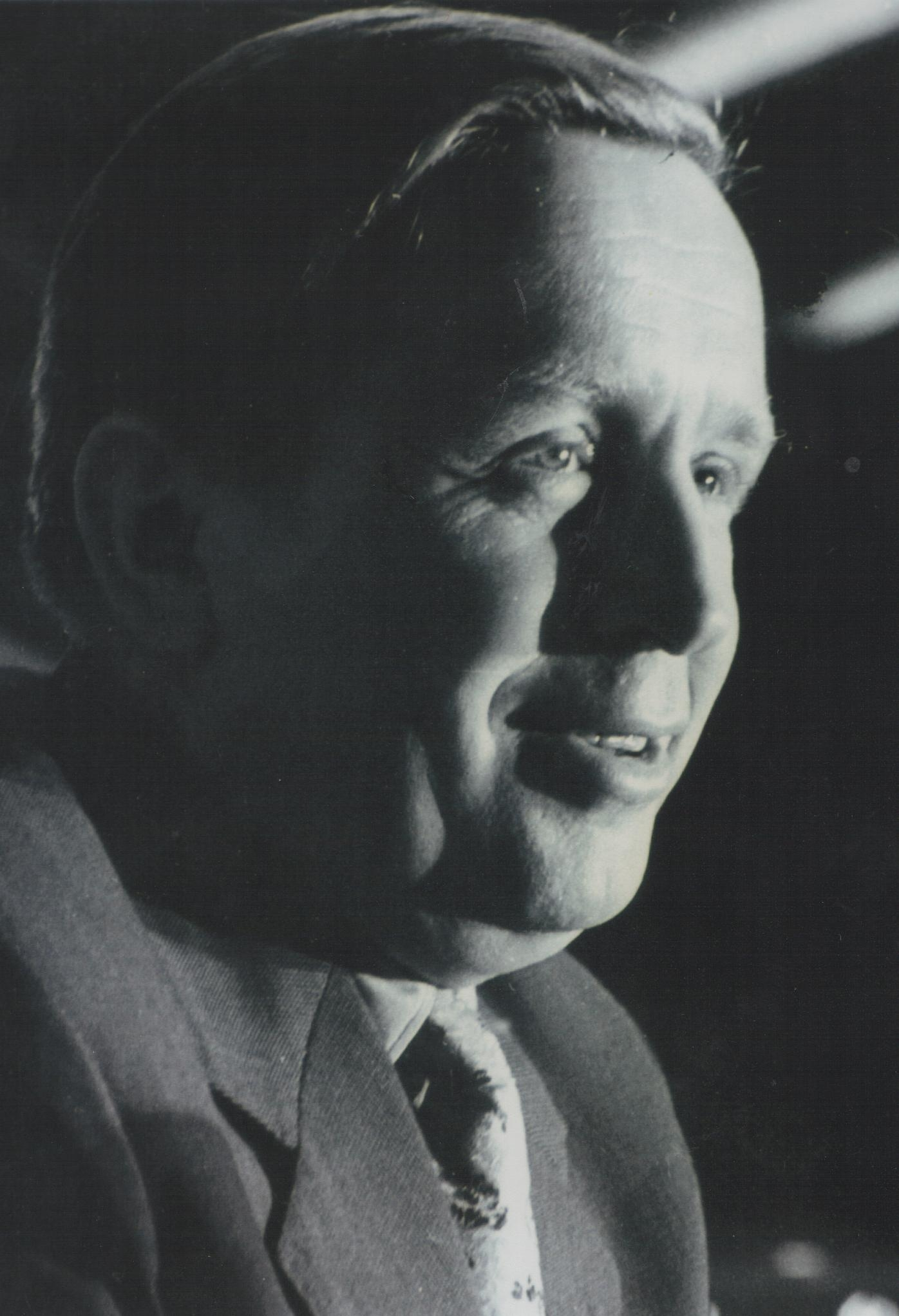
- Born: 1 January 1915; Hašani, Bosnia and Herzegovina, Austria-Hungary
- Died: 26 March 1984 (aged 69); Belgrade, SR Serbia, Yugoslavia
- Resting place: Alley of Distinguished Citizens, Belgrade New Cemetery
- Occupations: Novelist, short story writer

Branko Ćopić (Serbian Cyrillic: Бранко Ћопић, pronounced [brǎːnkɔ t͡ɕɔ̂pit͡ɕ]; 1 January 1915 – 26 March 1984) was a Yugoslav and Serbian writer. He wrote poetry, short stories, and novels, and became famous for his stories for children and young adults, often set during World War II in revolutionary Yugoslavia, written with characteristic humor in the form of ridicule, satire, and irony.

As a professional writer, Ćopić was very popular and was able to sell large numbers of copies. This allowed him to live solely from his writings, which was rare for novelists in Yugoslavia at the time. However, the quality of his writings brought him inclusion into primary school curricula, which meant that some of his stories found their way into textbooks, and some novels became compulsory reading.

In the early 1950s, he also wrote satirical stories, criticizing social and political anomalies and personalities from the country's political life of the time, for which he was considered a dissident and "heretic", and had to explain himself to the party hierarchy.

== Biography ==
Ćopić was born into a Bosnian Serb family on 1 January 1915 in the village of Hašani, near Bosanska Krupa in the Bosanska Krajina region of western Bosnia. He attended the junior gymnasium in Bihać, and teacher's colleges in Banja Luka, Sarajevo, and Karlovac before moving to Belgrade to study at the University of Belgrade Faculty of Philosophy until his graduation in 1940. He admitted that after arriving in Belgrade in 1936, he was "afraid of the big city" and was especially concerned he might get lost.

During the uprising in Bosanska Krajina in 1941, he joined the Partisans and remained in their ranks until the end of World War II. He was his detachment's political commissar, war correspondent for the Borba newspaper, and a cultural proletarian. That period of his life influenced much of his literary work, as can be seen by the themes he later wrote about. He received the Commemorative Medal of the Partisans of 1941. At the end of the war he returned to Belgrade where he worked as an editor for several magazines until 1949, including the children's magazine Pionir ("Pioneer"). On 16 December 1965 he became an associate member of the Serbian Academy of Sciences and Arts and was elected to full membership 7 March 1968, and a member of the Academy of Sciences and Arts of Bosnia and Herzegovina.

Many of his novels and stories were included in primary school curricula and textbooks. His works have been translated into more than thirty languages, including English, German, French, Russian, Albanian, Czech, Dutch, Italian, Macedonian, Chinese, Polish, Romanian, Turkish, Slovak, and Slovene, and some of them have been turned into TV series. He was featured on the 0.50 Bosnia and Herzegovina convertible mark bill, which has been withdrawn from circulation and replaced with coins.

Ćopić's biographer and close friend was Enes Čengić, a fellow Bosnian-Herzegovinian journalist and writer, who lived and worked in Zagreb, and was also biographer and sole beneficiary of Miroslav Krleža will regarding his entire opus, including significant portion of copyrights. Čengić has written three books (in several volumes) on Ćopić, namely Branko Ćopić i njegovi junaci u slici i prilici (transl. Branko Ćopić and His Heroes in Picture and Situation), Ćopićev humor i zbilja (1 i 2) (transl. Ćopić's Humor and Reality 1 and 2), Ćopić kroz svjetla i pomrčine (transl. Ćopić Through Light and Darkness), one publication Šesdeset godina života i šest miliona knjiga Branka Ćopića: prigodna publikacija (transl. Sixty Years of Life and Six Millions Books of Branko Ćopić: Publicati), while his daughter published one more from an unpublished manuscript, titled Branko Ćopić: Treba sanjati (transl. Branko Ćopić: Need to Dream), after her father died.

== Literary career ==
From at least 1951 until his death Branko Ćopić was a professional writer who lived solely of his writings as, due to his popularity, his books sold millions of copies, both in Yugoslavia and abroad.

His first published short story was Smrtno ruvo Soje Čubrilove ("Death robe of Soja Čubrilova"), printed in 1936 in the Belgrade daily Politika. Politika's editor, Žika Milićević, was known for his strictness and he initially rejected many of Ćopić's stories, but he persisted and Milićević eventually printed them in the newspapers. Milićević promised to publish two of his stories each month, if they are good. Before 1941 and the outbreak of World War II in Yugoslavia, Politika published 125 of his stories. Ćopić considered this collaboration with Politika as a "great stimulus" and the "beginning of the serious literary affirmation".

His first short stories collection Ćopić published in 1938, and continued to write throughout the war. He dedicated the first two published collection, entitled Pod Grmečom (transl. Under the Grmeč, 1938) and Borci i bjegunci (transl. Fighters and Runaways, 1939), to his homeland Bosnia and Herzegovina. These collection of short stories proved his gift for storytelling and were followed by others, including Planinci (transl. Mountain Men, 1940). In 1939 he was recipient of Milan Rakić Award, with 1,000 dinars money prize, which led him to proclaim "I was richer than the emperor". He was editor of the Pionir (transl. Pioneer) magazine from 1944 to 1949 and also a member of the editorial board of Savremenik (transl. Contemporary).

Regional mark of his prose can be recognized in the characters, locations, themes, and language of his home region, Bosnian Krajina. His pre-war prose was predominantly lyrical (collections like Rosa na bajonetima (transl. Dew on the Bayonets, 1946), Sveti magarac i druge priče (transl. Holy Donkey and Other stories), Surova škola (transl. Cruel School, 1948) but after the war, he subordinated the lyrical to the ideological and socially engaged. His short stories were often described as the "stories of a dreamer boy".

He published collections of poems Ognjeno rađanje domovine (transl. Fiery Birth of a Homeland, 1944) and Ratnikovo proljeće (transl. Warrior's Spring, 1947). Other short story collections Ljubav i smrt (transl. Love and Death, 1953). Ćopić enriched the war short stories with humor and comical elements while in the novels Prolom (transl. The Break-out, 1952) and Gluvi barut (transl. Silent Gunpowder, 1957), he gave a broad prose fresco of the first war years in Bosnian Krajina. The turning point in his post-war development was Doživljaji Nikoletine Bursaća (transl. The Adventures of Nikoletina Bursać). Novels Ne tuguj, bronzana stražo (transl. Bronze Guards, Don't Mourn, 1958) and Osma ofanziva (transl. The Eight Offensive, 1966) deal with the state organized colonization of the Krajina's population into the province of Vojvodina.

The collection Bašta sljezove boje (transl. The Mallow-color Garden, 1970) opens with a letter which Ćopić wrote to his late friend Zija Dizdarević (1916–42). In it, Ćopić sets the frame of the writing as a salvation from death and dark visions of the horsemen of the apocalypse. He perceives the world from the off-perspective of the good "fools", but despite the quixotic fervor and humor, the sense of sorrow, anxiety, disappointment, and anti-utopian situations breaks through. In the follow-up, Dani crvenog sljeza (transl. Days of Red Mallow), it all evolves into the collapse of the social ideals as expensively paid illusions.

He was also writing children's poetry and prose. Best known works include Priče partizanke (transl. Partisan Stories), Nasmejana sveska (transl. Smiley Notebook), U carstvu leptirova i medveda (transl. In the realm of Butterflies and Bears), Vratolomne priče (transl. Daredevil Stories), Ježeva kućica (transl. Hedgehog's House), Doživljaji mačka Toše (transl. Adventures of Toscho the Cat), Orlovi rano lete ("Eagles Fly Early"; 1957).

=== Social criticism ===
In the early 1950s, he also wrote satirical stories, criticizing anomalies and personalities from the country's political life of the time, corrupted by the materialism of the "comrades", blossomed bureaucracy and sycophancy, which he despised, and for which he was considered a dissident and "heretic" who had to explain himself to the party ranks.

Using humor and satire, Ćopić targeted what he perceived to be social ills of the fledgling Yugoslav communist society. In 1950, he published Jeretička priča (transl. Heretic Story), mocking the new phenomena he observed around him such as state-owned company managers, Yugoslav People's Army (JNA) generals, government ministers, as well as their families and in-laws, misusing publicly funded resources including specific instances of government-provided luxury cars being used by individuals from the above groups in order to be chauffeured to university lectures at faculties they recently enrolled in. In the story, state funds were also used by high state dignitaries to travel to expensive sea resorts, with a complete lack of willingness to throw away the benefits and privileges they obtained after the war. He was immediately attacked by his war compatriot Skender Kulenović in the next edition of the literary magazine Književne novine.

This was enough for the state security agency UDBA to open a file on him. Ćopić's harsh words against the political elite were conveyed to the secret police by one of his friends, who unbeknownst to Ćopić, was an UDBA agent with the code name Remington, after the typewriter. Ćopić's file was placed together with those of other authors, who at the time were being scrutinized by the state for similar reasons: Mira Alečković, Desanka Maksimović, Sava Nikolić, Dušan Kostić, Vasa Popović and Zuko Džumhur. Ćopić then published another critical work, Ko s đavolom priče piše (transl. He Who Writes Stories with the Devil). He was reprimanded by the Yugoslav Communist Party (KPJ), while the country's leader Josip Broz Tito publicly criticized the writer in 1950: "He [Ćopić] presented our entire society, top to bottom, as a negative one, thus advocating its termination. Such satire we will not allow and we won't let this go without an answer. He deserves a public response and to say, once for all, that we will not allow enemy satire that works towards breaking our unity. It is up to him personally to own up to his mistakes and to follow the road of our other socialist writers".

At one of the meetings of the Women's Antifascist Front of Yugoslavia (AFŽ), Tito angrily said of Ćopić: "He lies! He is not telling the truth!". Ćopić's mother Stoja, who attended the meeting, said to Tito "My Branko never lies". After continuous attacks from Tito personally, Ćopić hanged on his door a page from newspapers where Tito stated that he will not arrest him.

Ćopić was later accused of being an adherent of Milovan Đilas. In the autumn of 1953, defending himself from the "new class" (as Đilas labeled the Communist nouveau riche), in a letter to Veljko Vlahović, Ćopić wrote: "A massive number of sycophants, slimes, and invertebrates who are milling around the party, occupying all positions and imposing themselves like horse flies. This is especially visible among public and cultural figures, among those who should be the conscience of the people and engineers of the souls". In the late 1954, Ćopić's statement at the University of Belgrade Civil Engineering Faculty's forum that things still didn't change since he published Heretic Story, was followed by the publishing of the obvious police-informant's pamphlet in the student's magazine Student which declared Ćopić an enemy of the socialism. The irony was that Đilas himself was one of the leaders of the public "show trial" against Ćopić few years before.

Because of the story Izbor druga Sokrata (transl. The Election of Comrade Socrates), published in the NIN magazine, and the novel Gluvi barut (transl. Silent Gunpowder) printed in 1957, he was denounced again. Defending himself in front of the party commission, he stated: "I showed some of our people who were a bit dehumanized under the harsh conditions of the [war] battles, living in belief that they do what's best for the revolution." Though he said he will "fight to stay in the party, cause its nice to be there", he was expelled from it. He opposed the writing of the foreign and right-wing press, which used his criticism of the new system in Silent Gunpowder. Especially affirmative analyses of anti-Communism and leftist errors in Silent Gunpowder were published in West Germany's press. In 1966, Živojin Pavlović wanted to film a movie Silent Gunpowder, but the production house, Avala Film, backed off, because of the "politically unacceptable ideas in the script which depicts leftist errors". The film, to a great success, was made only in 1990, by Bato Čengić.

His contemporary comedy Odumiranje medveda (transl. Bear's Dying Out) from 1958 caused him further problems with the political establishment. After only several rehearsals of the play, dramatized by Soja Jovanović, it was banned from the Belgrade Drama Theatre, as "ordered from the top". It was played later, but never in Belgrade. During all this time when he was criticized and ignored by the authorities, he was regularly visited by author Ivo Andrić. When he was already considered too critical, no one wanted to sit next to him in the famous "Writer's Club" in Belgrade. One day Andrić sat next to him and advised him to switch to writing novels, as "no one reads them". Ćopić was stunned that Andrić even swore, as Andrić was regarded a personification of a diplomat and a gentleman. He accepted the suggestion, writing Silent Gunpowder, but only made things worse. After a period of party harassment, he was expelled from the party in 1960. After his expulsion from the party, the cultural centers began to massively cancel hosting of his literary lectures, citing "house painting" as the reason for cancellation. He once asked his [former] party comrades "how long is this painting going to last"?

He explained what he was writing in his defense when he was interrogated by the party apparatchiks: "Before you start writing, imagine that 50 years has passed already, that you and those who interrogate you today are not alive anymore, and someone starts to dig in their archives. Write in such a manner that you don't feel ashamed in front of that unknown man from the future."

Though he maintained for a while his jovial spirit, expulsion from the party was a major psychological blow. Apart from Tito, he was directly and publicly attacked and harassed by the party elite, including Moša Pijade and Milovan Đilas. He was much more hurt by the attacks from his colleague writers: Dušan Popović (journalist), Skender Kulenović, Oto Bihalji-Merin, Milorad Panić Surep, Gustav Krklec. He suffered a lot, understanding this is a betrayal of the friends. In the years to come they avoided him, "as if he had a tuberculosis".

About his social criticism, Ćopić once said: "And I, tired of all that satire regarding petite bourgeoisie, religion, priests, sextons and khawajas, didn't want to close my eyes on social and political issues in new Yugoslavia either".

== Personal life ==
His father and his uncle, nicknamed Nidžo (father's brother), were simultaneously engaged in WWI on the opposite sides, his father as a soldier of the Austro-Hungarian Army, fighting in the Carpathian Mountains, while his uncle was fighting as a volunteer in the Royal Serbian Army against the Austro-Hungarians. Both brothers survived and returned from the war. However, Branko's father died when he was four, and his uncle and his grandfather, alongside his mother, took care of him. His brother and sister were both killed in World War II. Brother Rajko was killed in 1942 and sister Smiljka (b. 1921) in 1943. Ćopić dedicated a poem to her, Grob u žitu (transl. Grave in the Grains).

Ćopić met his future wife Bogdanka Ilić, nicknamed Cica, in 1945. Bogdanka Ćopić later became a pediatrician and the two were married in 1950 and remained together until his death. The final ten years of Ćopić's life they spent in the building across the Beograđanka tower in downtown Belgrade.

Ćopić was an avid reader, a painting lover and praised film and theatre, even penning several screenplays. He liked Italian neorealism, movies like The Secret Life of Walter Mitty, The Wages of Fear and Disney's animated movies. He admired Miguel de Cervantes, Maxim Gorky, Miloš Crnjanski, Ivan Cankar, Miroslav Krleža, Isidora Sekulić, Oskar Davičo, and Mihailo Lalić and called himself Lički Bosanac ("Lika's Bosnian"). Ćopić said that loneliness is hard and that life is short so it should be spent in love, concord, and understanding.

=== Death ===
On Monday, 26 March 1984, Ćopić called his longtime close friend Momčilo Srećković to come from Obrenovac to Belgrade. Srećković first met with Ćopić's wife, who told him that Branko had visited his doctor earlier that day and that he was depressed. Srećković found him around 16:00, sitting in Pioneers Park. They walked to Terazije, where they had a Cockta soda in the summer garden of the Hotel Moskva with Ćopić "opening his soul". He said that for several years he had problems writing, naming The Mallow Color Garden, The Adventures of Nikoletina Bursać and The Eighth Offensive as his favorites, and was sentimental about his childhood. According to Srećković, Ćopić was "talking a lot, more than I could memorize".

They continued to Zeleni Venac and the Bridge of Brotherhood and Unity across the Sava, today called Branko's Bridge. Ćopić recollected his arrival to Belgrade, when he slept under the bridge (at the time, it was King Alexander Bridge, which was demolished during the war), saying "this bridge is my destiny". While showing the bench under the bridge where he slept back in 1936, Ćopić's glasses fell down onto the pavement below. Srećković went down the stairs to retrieve it, but when he climbed back to the bridge, Ćopić had already crossed the river to the other, New Belgrade side. Srećković hurried to catch him, calling him, but when he got close, Ćopić threw himself over the metal fence, falling on the pavement on the Sava's left bank.

Police initially held Srećković as a witness, but also suspecting him of pushing Ćopić from the bridge. He was cleared after Ćopić's widow Bogdanka came to the police, bringing his suicide letter he left in the apartment. He ended the letter with "Goodbye, you beautiful and scary life".

The bridge in general gained an infamous reputation as a suicide bridge, as some 40 people try to commit suicide by jumping from it every year. As the bridge is an extension of the Brankova Street, named after Branko Radičević, a Serbian romanticist poet, it was named after the street. However, an urban myth developed since then that the bridge was named after Ćopić's jump.

Ćopić repeated several times to his close friend and biographer Enes Čengić that he would kill himself, and the reason he gave was his inability to even remember or recognize the people or things around him, which he blamed on his advanced sclerosis, so that he could no longer write a letter.

== Accolades ==
He received numerous awards from his early writing days: Academy of Seven Arts Award (1938), Rakić Award (1939), Serbian Royal Academy Award (1940), Culture and Arts Committee award (1947, 1948), FNRJ Government Award (1949), Trade Unions Award (1953), Award for the Children Literature (1956), City of Belgrade October Award (1956). In 1958 he received a NIN Award for the best novel for "Bronze guards, don't mourn".

He is a recipient of several Yugoslav decorations. He received the Order of the Yugoslav Flag with Sash (I rank), Order of Merits for the People with Golden Star (I rank), Order of Brotherhood and Unity with a Golden Wreath (I rank), Order of the Republic with a Silver Wreath (II rank), Order of Merits for the People with Silver Rays (II rank) and the Commemorative Medal of the Partisans of 1941.

== Assessment ==
Many of the characters he created were based on the real persons from his home region, on the slopes of the Grmeč mountain. Ćopić himself considered that his life works are three novels: The Mallow Color Garden, The Adventures of Nikoletina Bursać and The Eighth Offensive.

Film director Puriša Đorđević made a documentary on Ćopić in 2016, titled Moja Mala iz Bosanske Krupe. In 2023, a documentary Moj Branko ne laže (transl. My Branko is not lying) directed by Branko Lazić and written by Saša Berendika was made. It was titled after the words Ćopić's mother used to defend him from Tito.

Author and literary critic Mihajlo Pantić wrote that, no matter whether he was writing poems, novels or stories, Ćopić was always a lyric poet. Pantić added that, standing on the shoulders of his predecessors like Petar Kočić and nameless folk storytellers from his homeland, Ćopić was the constant of Serbian 20th century literature and its last authentic storyteller. Documentarist Dejan Petrović described Ćopić as "Serbian Tolkien".

== Works ==
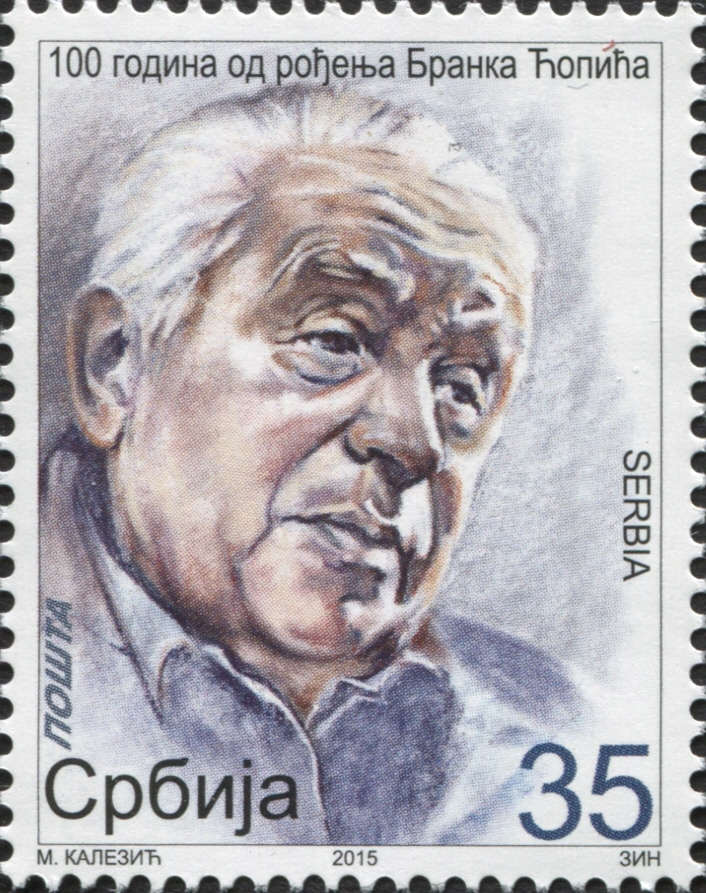
Ćopić on a 2015 Serbian stamp

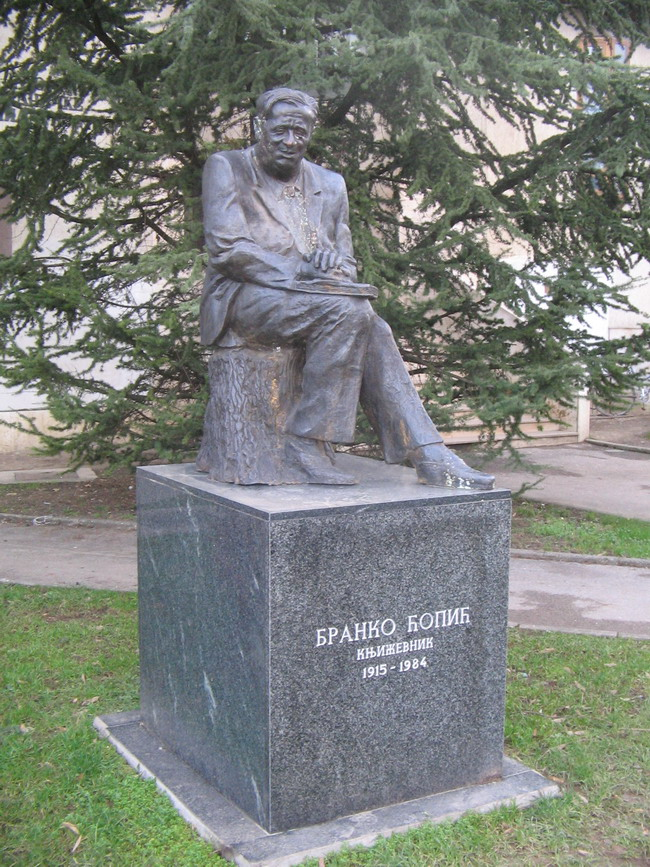
Monument of Ćopić in Banja Luka

=== Novels ===
- Prolom – The Break-out (1952)
- Gluvi barut – Silent Gunpowder (1957)
- Ne tuguj, bronzana stražo – Bronze Guards, Don't Mourn (1958)
- Osma ofanziva – The Eighth Offensive (1966)

=== Works for children ===
- Orlovi rano lete – Eagles Fly Early (1957)
- Slavno vojevanje – Glorious Combat (1960) and
- Bitka u Zlatnoj dolini – The Battle of Golden Valley

(these three are known as „Pionirska trilogija“ – The Pioneer Trilogy);

- Magareće godine – "Donkey" Years (meaning: The Tough Teens)
- Balada o ribaru i mačku – Ballad of the Fisherman and the Cat
- Glava u klancu noge na vrancu – Head in the Col Legs on the Horse
- Ježeva kućica – Hedgehog's House (1949)
- Doživljaji mačka Toše – Adventures of Toscho the Cat
- Bašta sljezove boje – The Mallow Color Garden
- U carstvu medvjeda i leptirova – In the kingdom of bears and butterflies
- Priče ispod zmajevih krila – The stories under the dragon's wings

=== Films and television series made after Ćopić's writings ===
- "Živjeće ovaj narod" (1947)
- "Major Bauk" (1951)
- "Grob u žitu" (1951)
- "Nikoletina Bursać (1964)
- Eagles Fly Early (1966)
- "Četrdeset prva" (1971)
- "Hajdučka vremena" (1977)
- "Mala moja iz Bosanske Krupe" (1978)
- "Osma ofanziva", TV-series (1979)
- "Bježaćemo čak u Liku" (1979)
- "Odumiranje međeda" (1982)
- "Smiješne i druge priče" TV-series (1986)
- "Razgovori stari" (1986)
- Silent Gunpowder (1990)
- "Magareće godine" (1994)
- Ježeva kućica (2017)

== See also ==
- Bosnia and Herzegovina literature
- Serbian literature
