= Church of St. Nicholas, Kosovica =

Place of worship in Kosovica

Saint Nicholas' Church
- Црква Светог Николе; Crkva Svetog Nikole
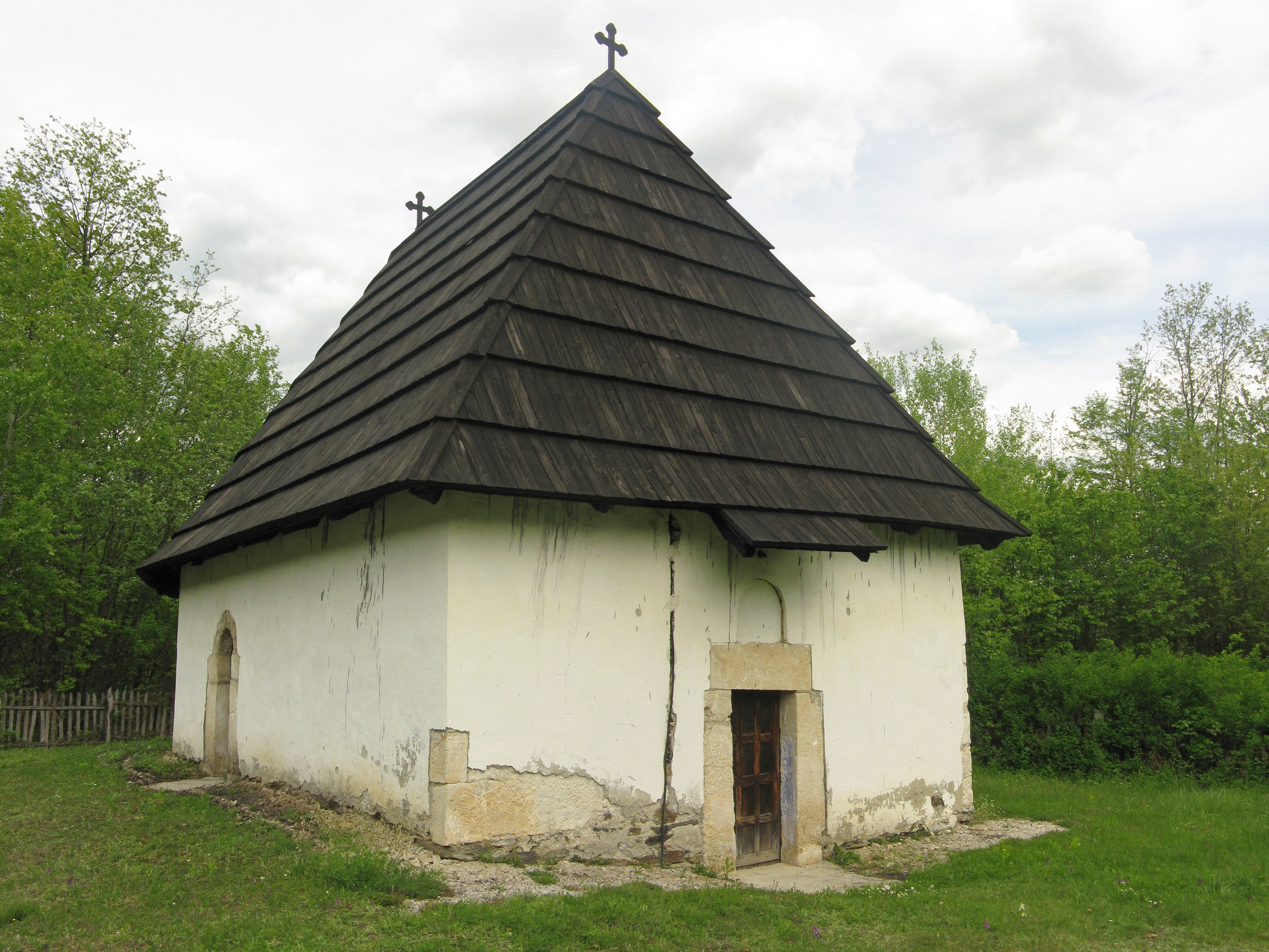

Religion
- Affiliation: Serbian Orthodox
- Leadership: Institute for Cultural Heritage Preservation Kraljevo
- Year consecrated: Middle Ages

Location
- Location: Kosovica, Ivanjica, Serbia
- Interactive map of Saint Nicholas' Church
- Coordinates: 44°19′58″N 20°11′23″E

Website
- Official website

The Church of Saint Nicholas (Serbian Cyrillic: Црква Светог Николе) is a church of the Serbian Orthodox Church, located in the village of Kosovica near Ivanjica. The original church dates back to the Middle Ages. The present structure is believed to have been built in the 19th century upon the foundations of an old church. According to tradition, the original building was built after the Battle of Kosovo, in memory of the soldiers who passed through the area whilst withdrawing after their defeat in 1389.

== Architecture ==
The church is a single-naved basilica with a large semi-circular sanctuary apse. It was built in rubble and has a barrel vault. The roof is covered with shingles. Inside the church, poorly preserved parts of the iconostasis which belonged to an earlier church can be seen; the most prominent among them is the despotic icon of Jesus Christ and a crucifix.

== Gallery ==
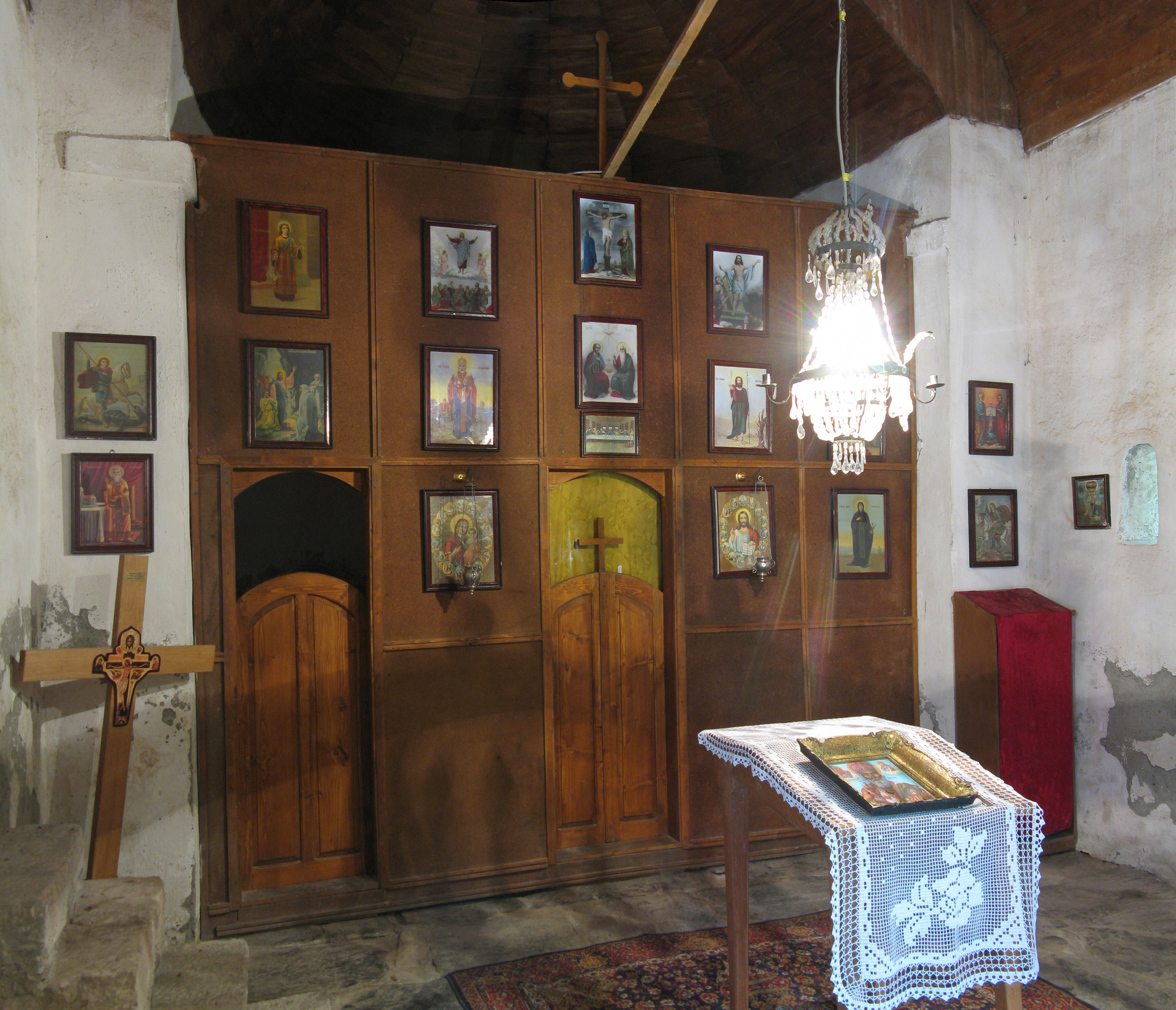
The interior of the church with the iconostasis

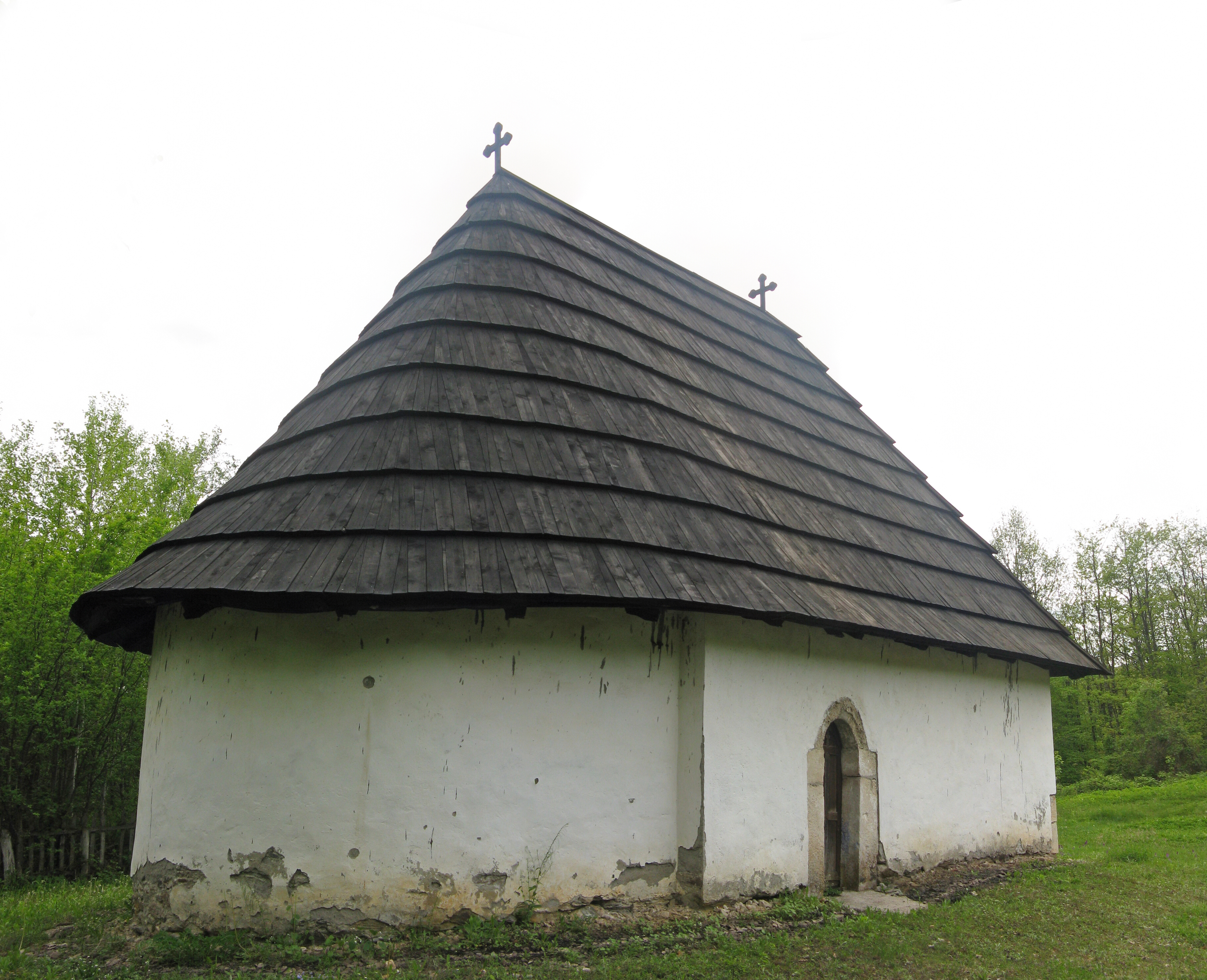
North side of the church

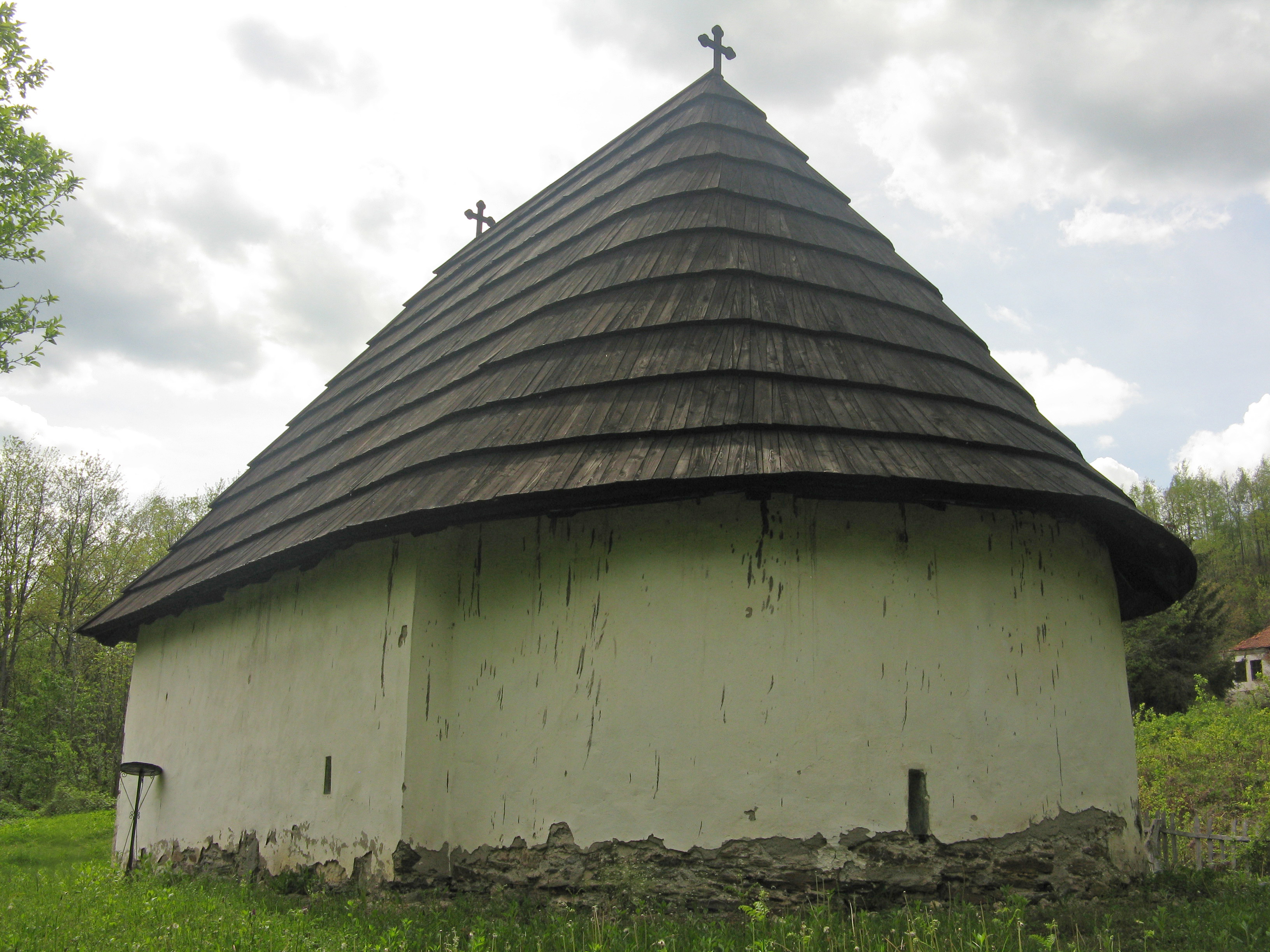
East side of the church
