= Kosovica =

- Village
- Location within Serbia
- Coordinates: 43°29′35″N 20°12′41″E
- Country: Serbia
- District: Moravica District
- Municipality: Ivanjica

Area
  - Total: 18.89 km^{2} (7.29 sq mi)

Population (2011)
  - Total: 159
  - Density: 8.42/km^{2} (21.8/sq mi)
- Time zone: UTC+1 (CET)
  - Summer (DST): UTC+2 (CEST)

Kosovica is a village in the municipality of Ivanjica, Serbia. According to the 2011 census, the village has a population of 159 inhabitants.

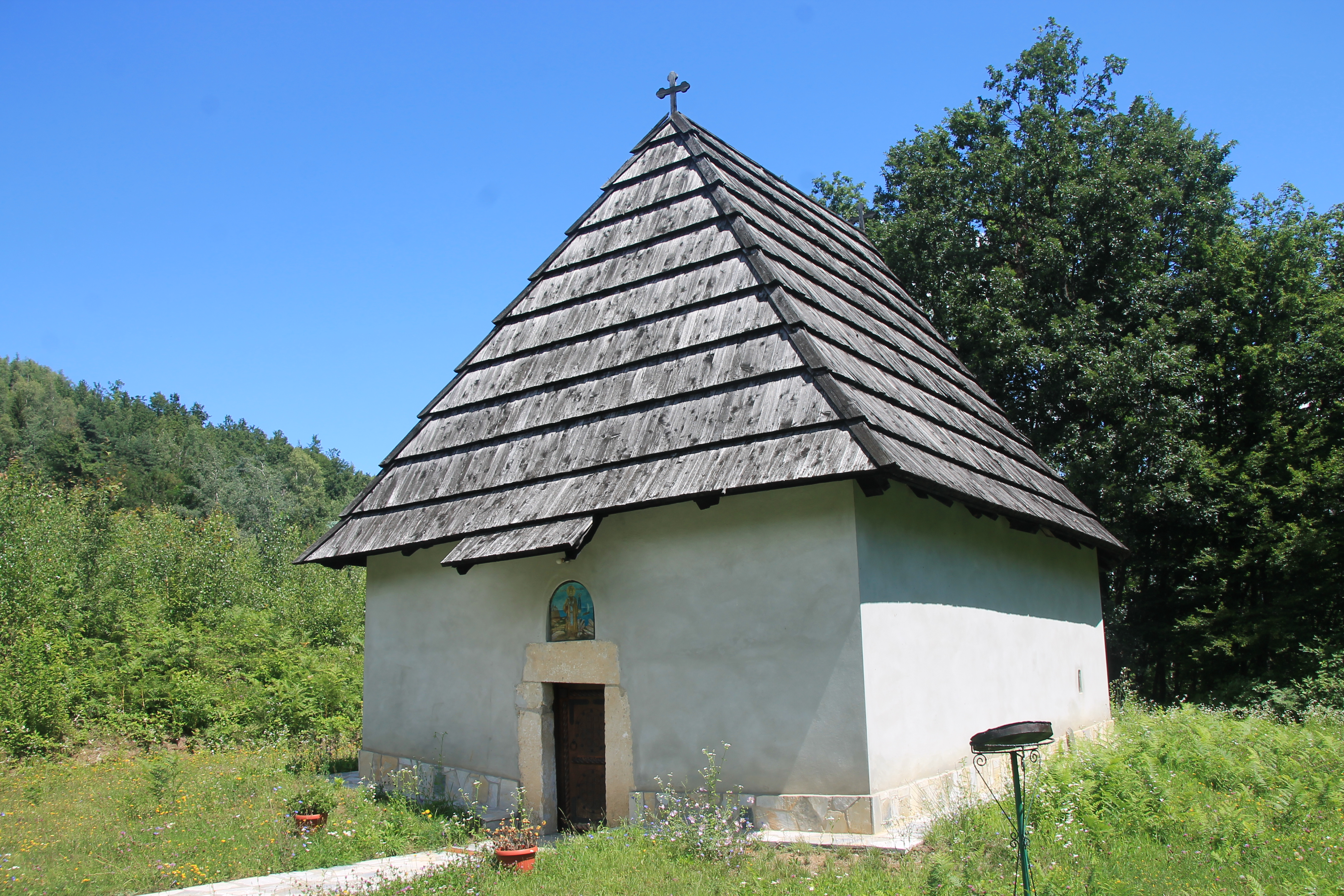
Church of St. Nicholas
