= Gradac, Ivanjica =

Gradac Градац
- Village
- Location within Serbia
- Coordinates: 43°22′59″N 20°19′08″E
- Country: Serbia
- District: Moravica District
- Municipality: Ivanjica

Area
  - Total: 12.40 km^{2} (4.79 sq mi)

Population (2011)
  - Total: 73
  - Density: 5.9/km^{2} (15/sq mi)
- Time zone: UTC+1 (CET)
  - Summer (DST): UTC+2 (CEST)

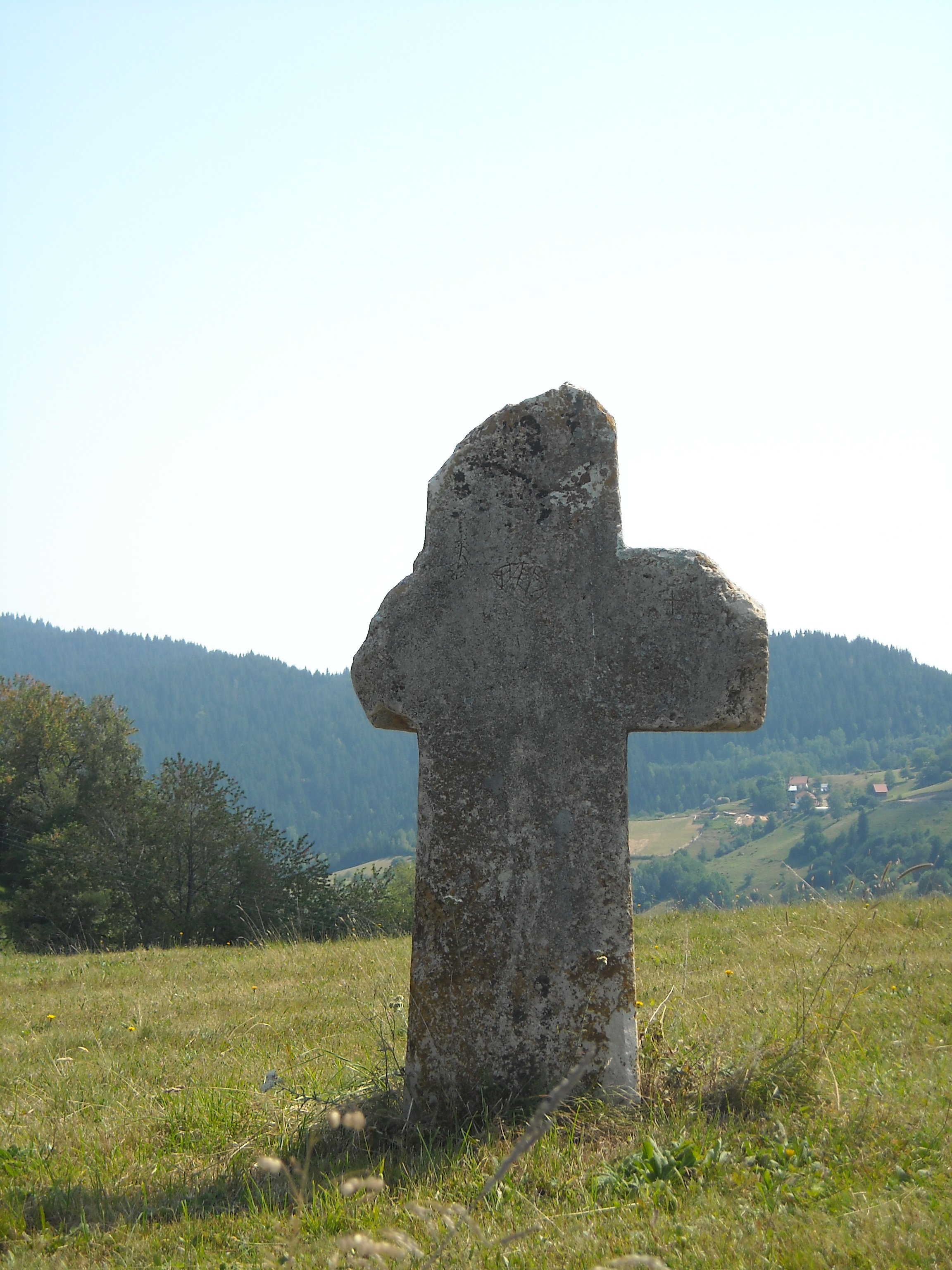
The Cross of Gradac

Gradac is a village in the municipality of Ivanjica, Serbia. According to the 2011 census, the village has a population of 73 inhabitants. The village is home to the Cross of Gradac, a large stone cross erected in 1662 that served as a village record.
