= Cross of Gradac, Gradac =

Serbian cultural monument

Cross of Gradac
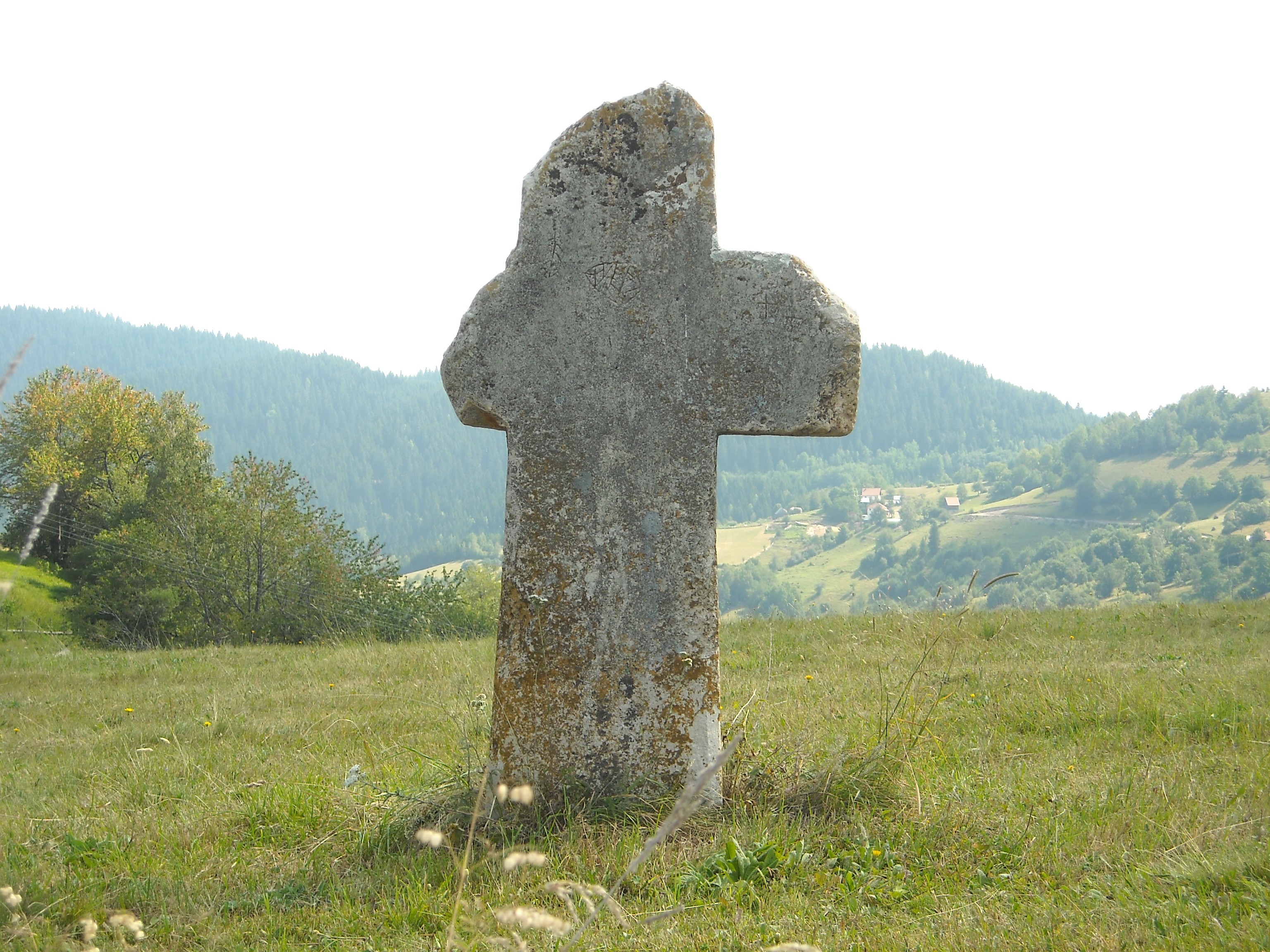

Religion
- Year consecrated: Unknown

Location
- Location: Ivanjica, Gradac
- Interactive map of Cross of Gradac
- Coordinates: 43°23′3″N 20°19′13″E

Cross of Gradac is a cultural monument located in the village of Gradac on the property of Ćurčić Dragutin, surrounded by a field. The cross was built in 1645 and served as a village record.

== Architecture ==
Despite its unusually large size, the Cross of Gradac is not near a cemetery, nor is it thought to have been designed to be part of a graveyard. Its purpose is undetermined. The Cross is shallowly inscribed with Cyrillic text, but has been badly damaged, making it consequently difficult to read. This cross was used as a village record for more than a century. A partial decryption shows that the symbols are from the early Christian period and were inscribed in 1662.

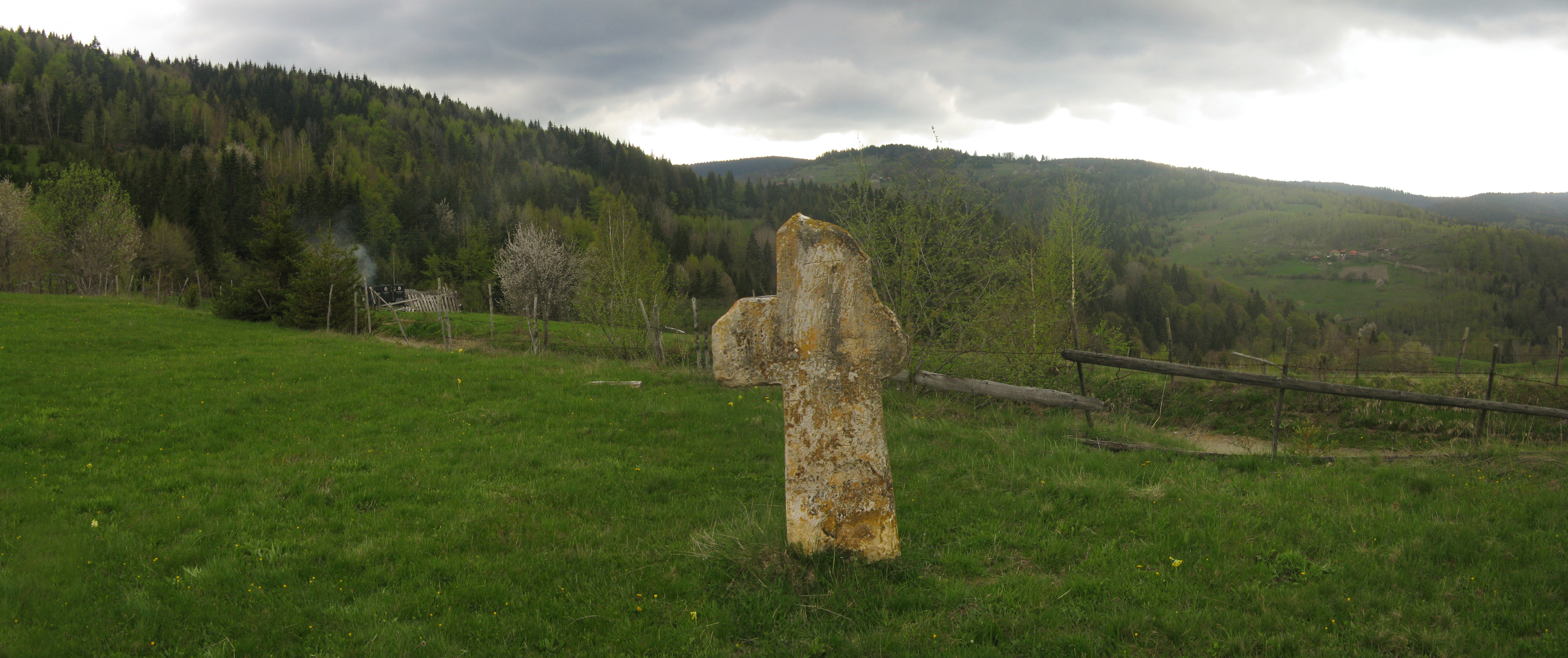
Panoramic view
