= Zlatarić =

Zlatarić (Serbo-Croatian pronunciation: [zlǎtarit͡ɕ]) is a surname. Notable people with the surname include:

- Dinko Zlatarić (1558–1613), Croatian poet and translator from Dubrovnik, considered the best translator of the Croatian Renaissance
- House of Zlatarić ("zlatar" meaning "goldsmith" in Croatian), an old noble family from Dubrovnik with origins in Dalmatia
- Nebojša Zlatarić (1953–2014), Serbian former striker

== See also ==
- Zlatarić, Valjevo, a village in Serbia
