= Valjevo =

Valjevo Ваљево (Serbian)
- City
- City of Valjevo
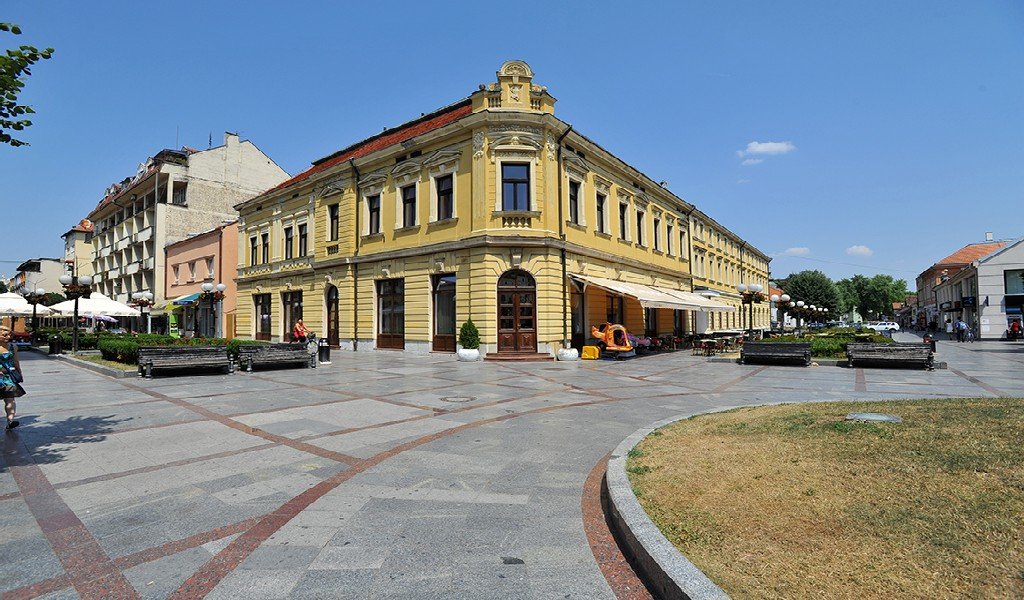
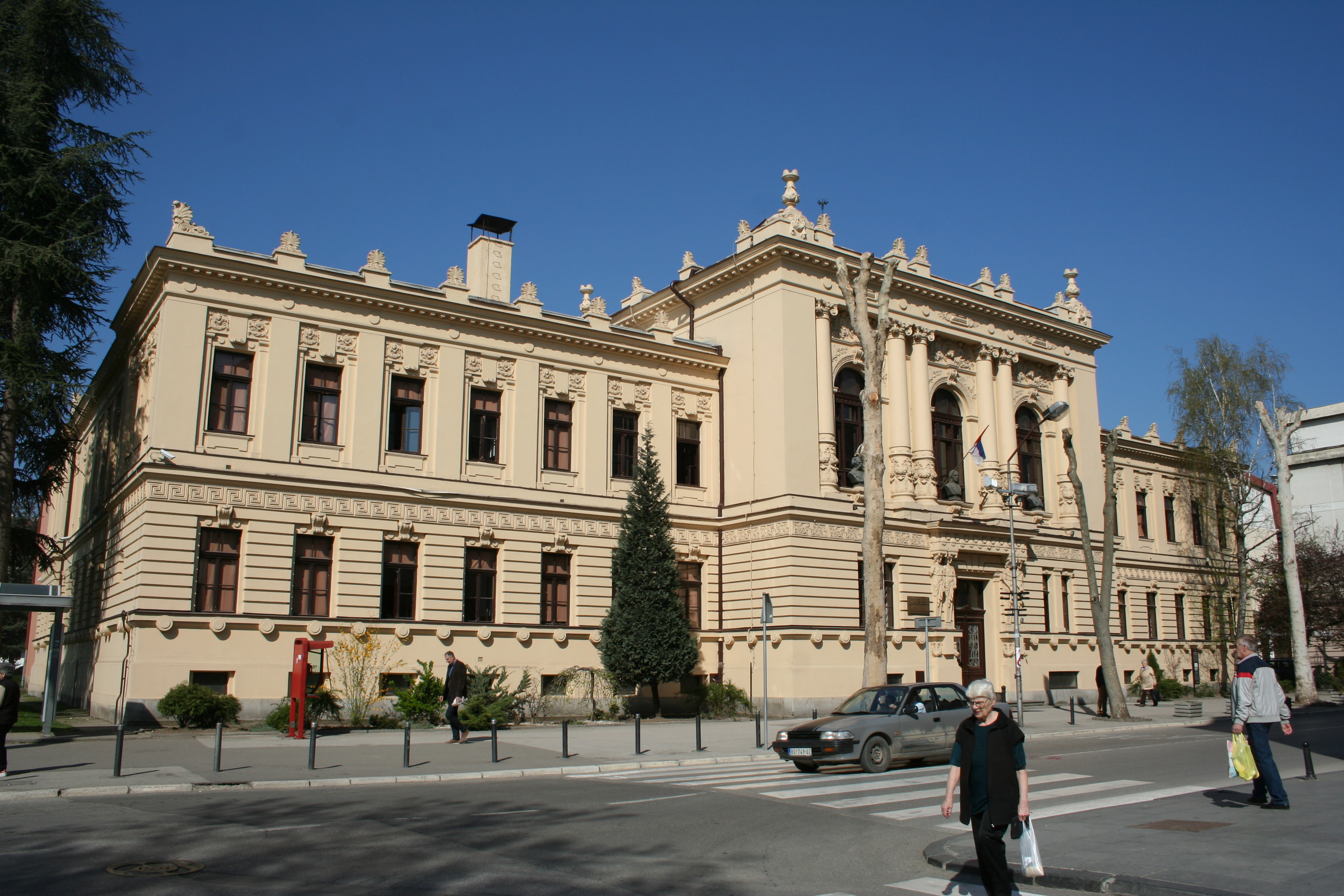
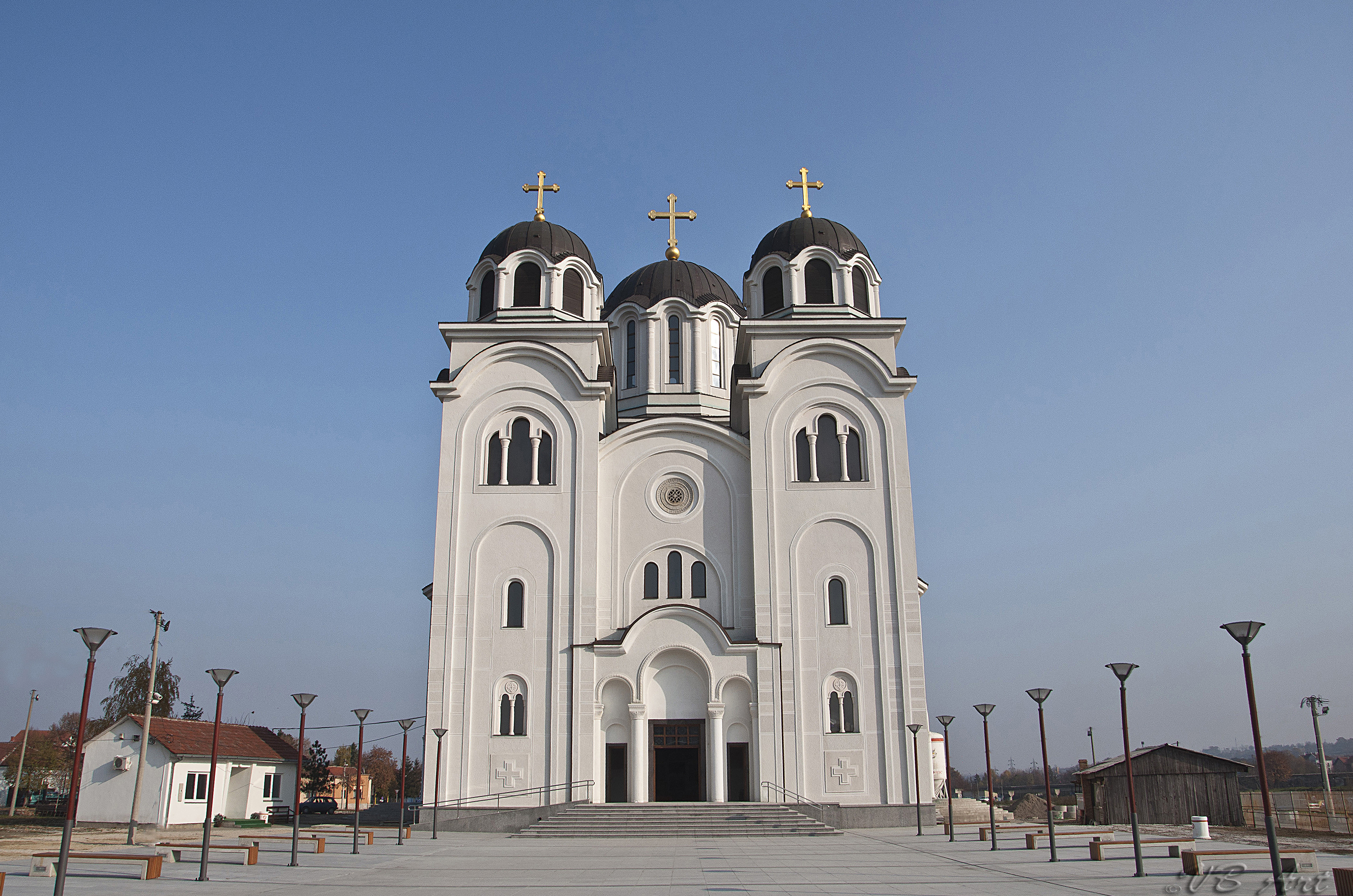
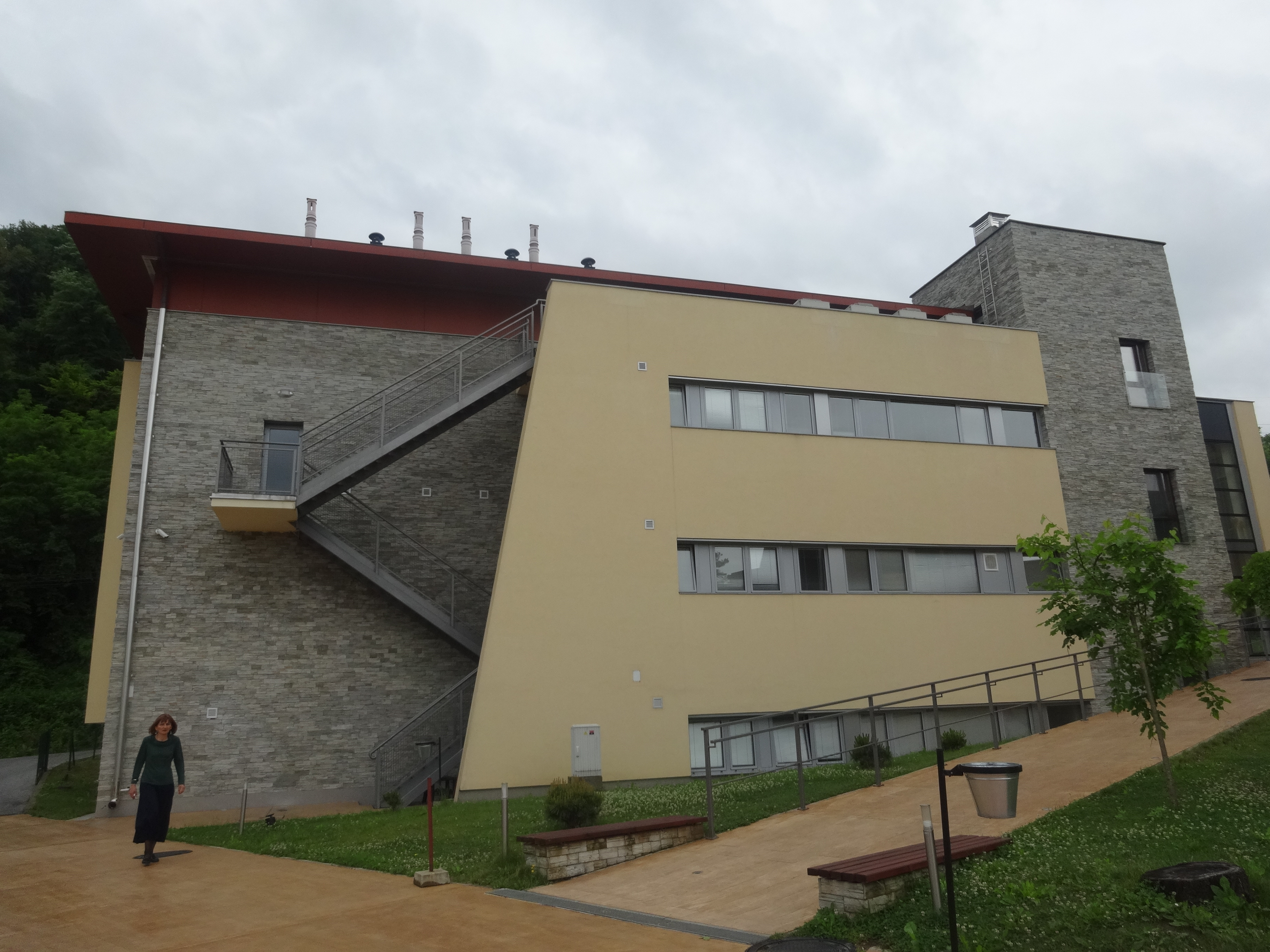
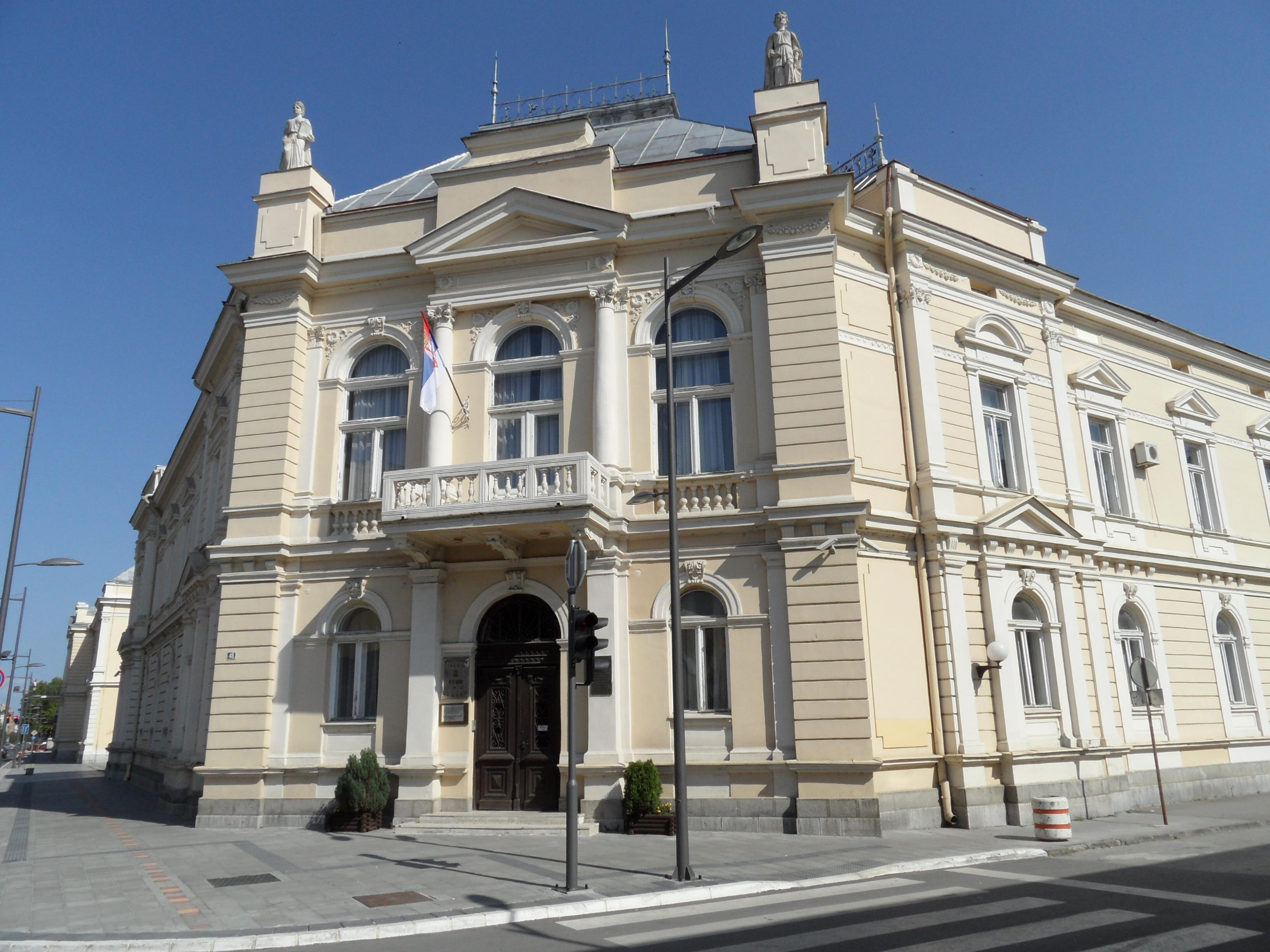
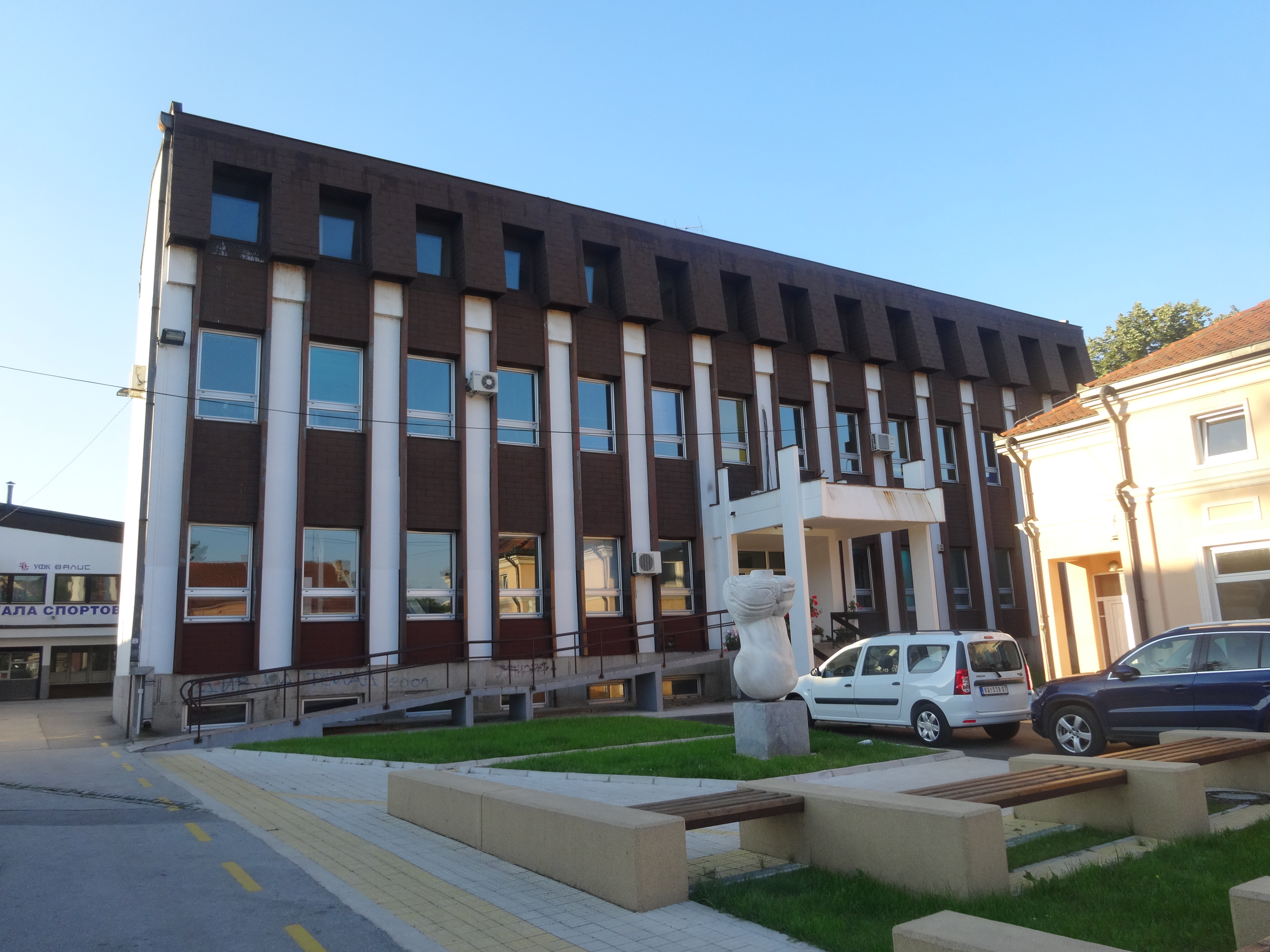
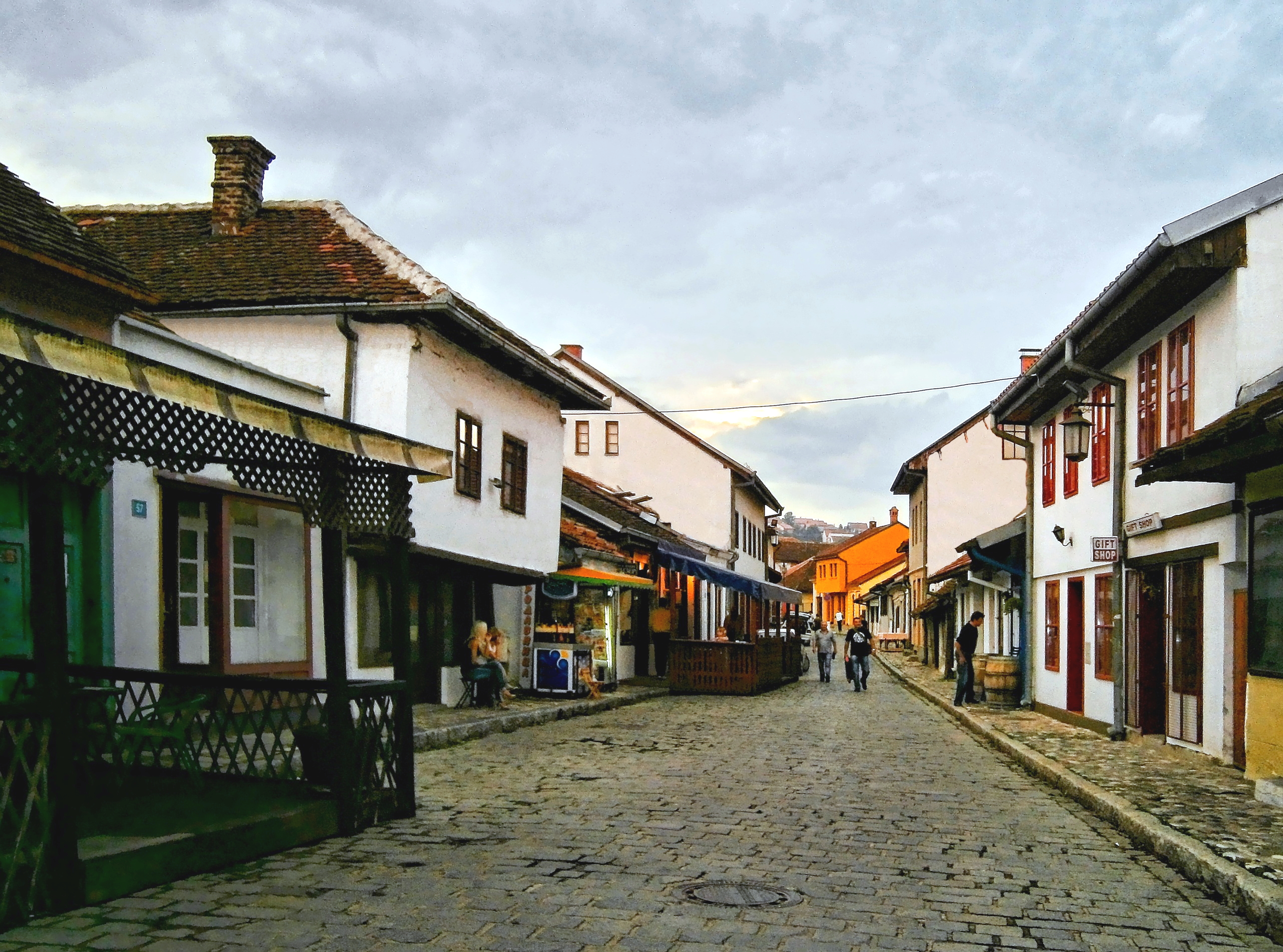
- City centre of Valjevo Valjevo Gymnasium Temple of Our Lord's Resurrection Petnica Science Center Valjevo Courthouse Valjevo Sports Hall Tešnjar- old urban settlement

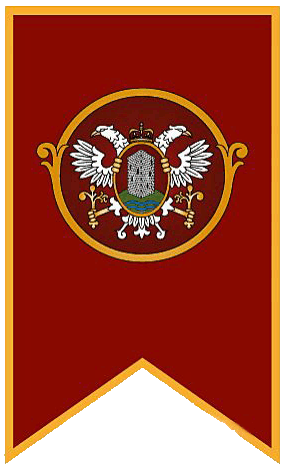
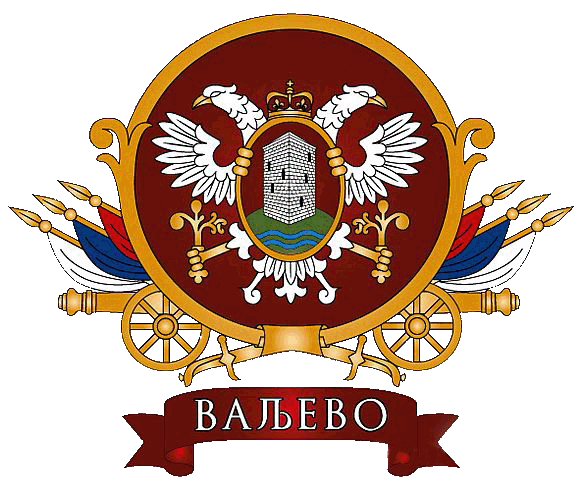
- Flag Coat of arms

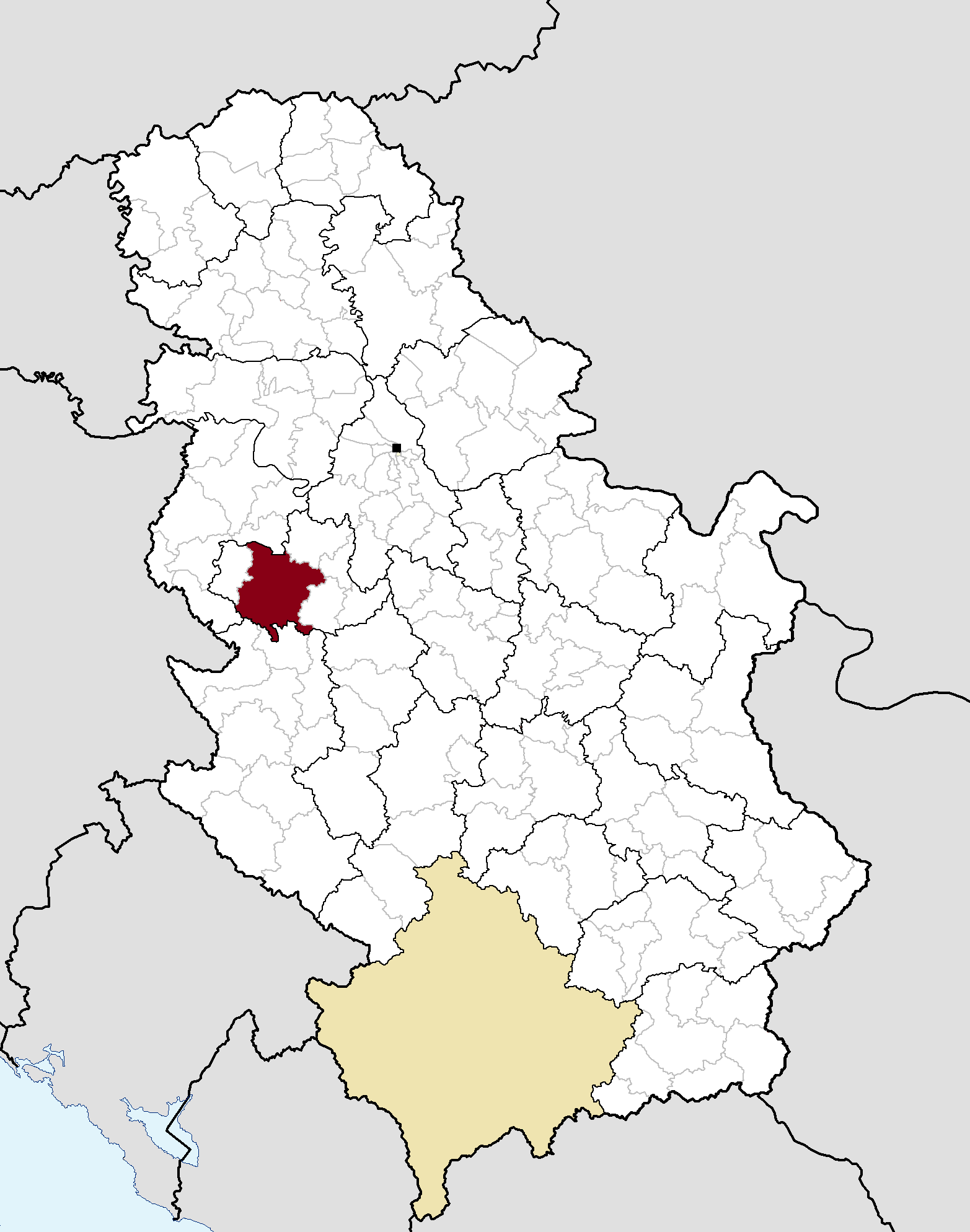
- Location of the city of Valjevo within Serbia
- Coordinates: 44°16′N 19°53′E
- Country: Serbia
- Region: Šumadija and Western Serbia
- District: Kolubara
- Settlements: 77

Government
  - Mayor: Lazar Gojković (SNS)

Area
  - Rank: 17th in Serbia
  - Urban: 27.44 km^{2} (10.59 sq mi)
  - Administrative: 905 km^{2} (349 sq mi)
- Elevation: 199 m (653 ft)

Population (2022 census)
  - Rank: 15th in Serbia
  - Urban: 56,145
  - Urban density: 2,046/km^{2} (5,299/sq mi)
  - Administrative: 82,169
  - Administrative density: 90.8/km^{2} (235/sq mi)
- Time zone: UTC+1 (CET)
  - Summer (DST): UTC+2 (CEST)
- Postal code: 14000
- Area code: +381(0)14
- ISO 3166 code: SRB
- Car plates: VA
- Official languages: Serbian
- Website: www.valjevo.org.rs

Valjevo (Serbian Cyrillic: Ваљево, pronounced [ʋâːʎeʋo]) is a city and the administrative center of the Kolubara District in western Serbia. According to the 2022 census, the city itself has a population of 56,145 while the city administrative area has 82,169 inhabitants. The city is situated along the river Kolubara.

== History ==
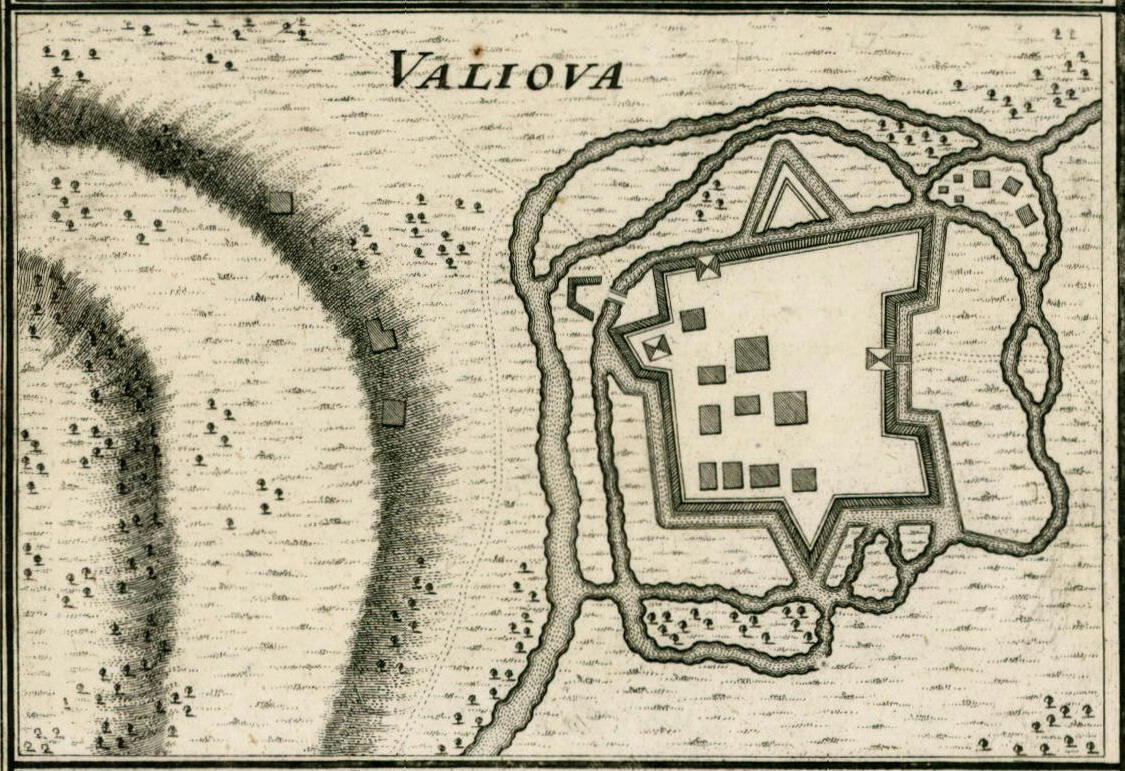
A map of the fortifications of Valjevo during Habsburg rule, 1738

In the nearby village of Petnica, scientists found the first complete neolithic habitat in Serbia and dated it at 6,000 years old. In Roman times this area was part of the province of Moesia. Valjevo was mentioned for the first time in 1393. It was an important staging post on the trade route that connected Bosnia to Belgrade.

During Ottoman rule, according to Matija Nenadović, there were 24 mosques in Valjevo in the late 18th century.

At the beginning of the 19th century most of the territory of Serbia rapidly transformed. The Serbian revolution began with armed rebellion. In 1804, the local Serb population had rebelled against the Ottoman lords and liberated a large part of Serbia. One cause for the revolution was the killing of two prominent Serbian commanders by the Ottomans. The two well-known knights, Ilija Birčanin and Aleksa Nenadović, were beheaded in Valjevo on the bridge over the Kolubara.

The settlement's development accelerated further in the 20th century, when Valjevo became an important industrial and cultural center. During the First World War, the battle of Kolubara was fought in the immediate vicinity. A large hospital for the wounded was in the town. One of the captured partisan leaders Stjepan Filipović was executed by the Nazis in Valjevo in 1942.

In 1999, Valjevo was repeatedly bombed during the NATO intervention in Yugoslavia.

== Settlements ==
The city includes the neighbourhoods of Tešnjar, Bair, Brđani, Popare, Gradac, Peti Puk, Kličevac, Boričevac, Radino Brdo, Novo Naselje.

Apart from the city, Valjevo covers the administrative area which includes the following settlements:

- Babina Luka
- Bačevci
- Balinović
- Belić
- Beloševac
- Beomužević
- Blizonje
- Bobova
- Bogatić
- Brangović
- Brankovina
- Brezovice
- Bujačić
- Degurić
- Divci
- Divčibare
- Donja Bukovica
- Donje Leskovice
- Dračić
- Dupljaj
- Gola Glava
- Gorić
- Gornja Bukovica
- Gornja Grabovica
- Gornje Leskovice
- Jasenica
- Jazovik
- Joševa
- Jovanja
- Klanica
- Klinci
- Kotešica
- Kovačice
- Kozličić
- Kunice
- Lelić
- Loznica
- Lukavac
- Majinović
- Mijači
- Miličinica
- Mrčić
- Oglađenovac
- Osladić
- Paklje
- Paune
- Petnica
- Popučke
- Pričević
- Prijezdić
- Rabas
- Rađevo Selo
- Ravnje
- Rebelj
- Rovni
- Sandalj
- Sedlari
- Sitarice
- Sovač
- Stanina Reka
- Stapar
- Strmna Gora
- Stubo
- Sušica
- Suvodanje
- Taor
- Tubravić
- Tupanci
- Valjevska Kamenica
- Veselinovac
- Vlaščić
- Vragočanica
- Vujinovača
- Zabrdica
- Zarube
- Zlatarić
- Žabari

== Geography ==
The Valjevo mountain range (Medvednik, Jablanik, Povlen, Maljen, Suvobor), with gently-rolling hills surrounds the town. Divčibare is a plateau in the mountain of Maljen and has an average altitude of 1000 m. It is 28 km from Valjevo and 110 km from Belgrade.

The canyon of the Gradac River (also the name of a Valjevo suburb) ends in the town centre. The Gradac is one of Europe's cleanest rivers, as evidenced by the presence of Eurasian otters. It abounds in brook trout. Also, the artificial lake Rovni is located 15 kilometers from the center of Valjevo.

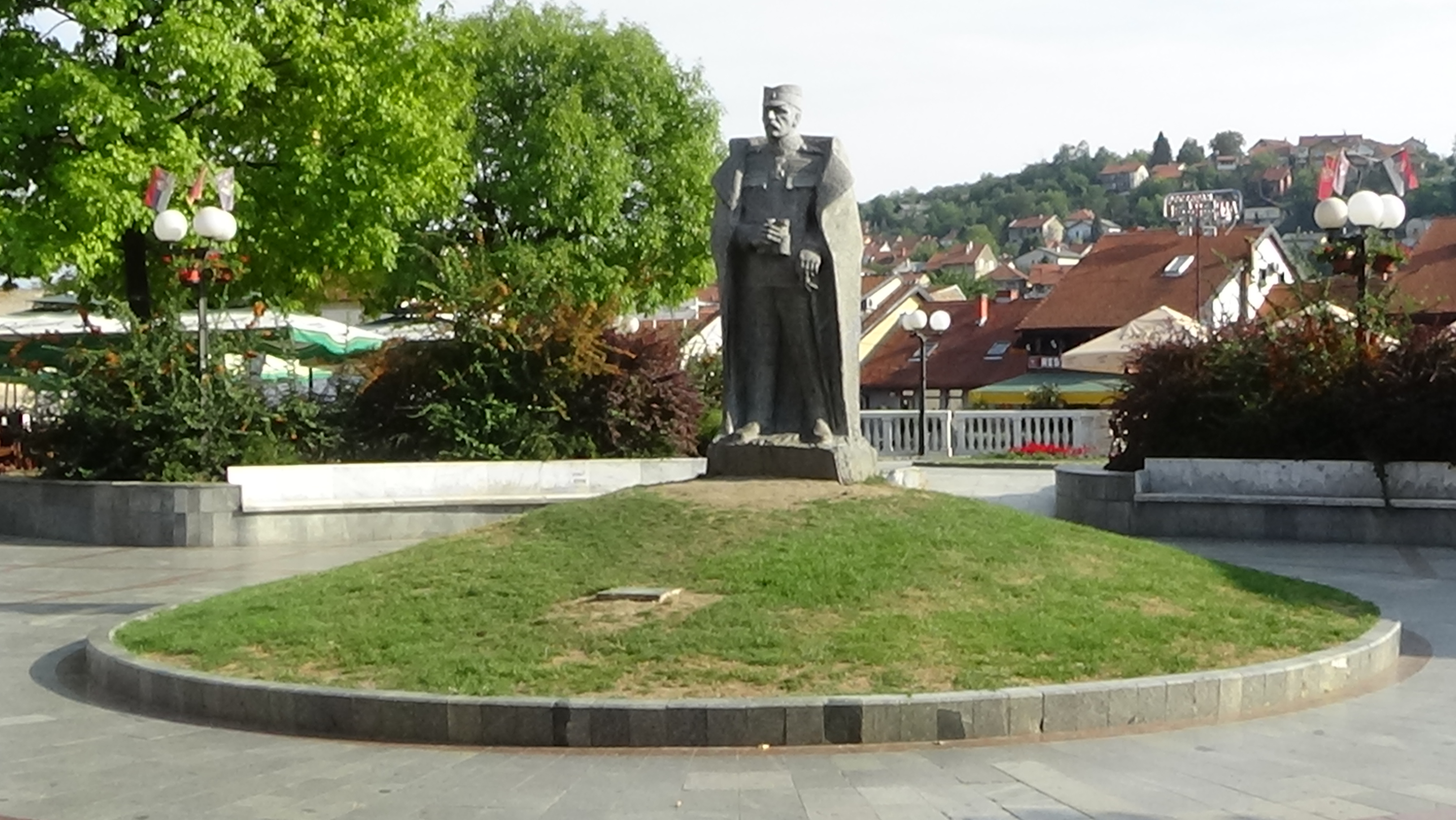
Duke Živojin Mišić statue in Valjevo

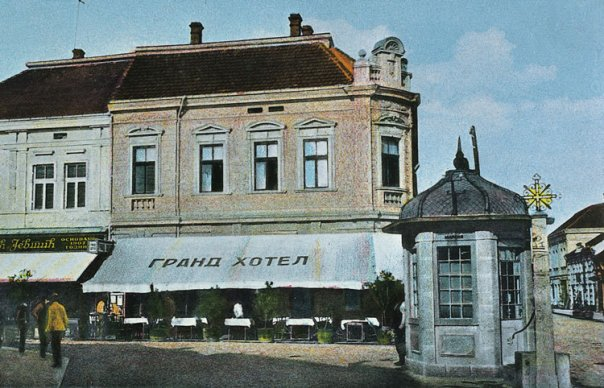
Valjevo in the first half of the 20th century

Valjevo time-lapse

=== Amenities ===
The Valjevo mountain range offers clean air, medicinal herbs, forest fruits and wild game. The vicinity is kept free of industrialisation and the soil is unpolluted, so the food grown there is healthy. Hunting and fishing in the mountain rivers is common. The air-spa of Divčibare offers rest and recreation.

Vrujci Spa has mud baths for rheumatic diseases, as well as a hotel and sports complex with swimming pools.

Old water mills are found in the thirteen square kilometers natural reserve.

In Petnica, 5km away from Valjevo, the Petnica Science Center supports young researchers.

The Nenadović Tower (Кула Ненадовића), originally an armory built by Jakov Nenadović and his son Jevrem in spring 1813, is adjacent to the road to Šabac, at the edge of Kličevac hill. The construction material was stone from an older Vitković tower. Later, the Ottomans turned it into a prison.

=== Surroundings ===
The village of Brankovina is near Valjevo and is associated with the Nenadovic family. Its main sights form a cultural and historical complex that includes the Church of Saint Archangel, the Archpriest's school, the school attended by Desanka Maksimovic, the Old Courtoom, the Nenadovic family's sleeping outbuilding, and the graves of the Nenadovic family and Maksimovic. The church yard also has old Sobrasica summer houses.

Several ancient monasteries are located in the area surrounding of Valjevo, including Pustinja, Lelić, and Ćelije. The sites on which the current monasteries stand have been used for religious purposes since the 10th century, although the current church buildings date to between 14th and 17th centuries. Pustinja Monastery is located in the cleft of a remote mountainous valley and contains rare Serbian medieval frescoes. Excavations have shown that the current church was built on the foundations of a much older church. Parts of the foundation and an unidentified tomb, much older than the church itself, were discovered. The church is only accessible by a steep path. However, despite its inaccessibility, the Turks managed to damage the monastery more than once. It was damaged in 1683 during the invasion of Turkish army to Vienna. Pustinja is today an active female monastery.

=== Climate ===
The climate in this area has mild differences between highs and lows, with adequate rainfall year-round. The Köppen Climate Classification subtype for this climate is "Cfa" (Warm Temperate Climate).

Climate data for Valjevo (1991–2020, extremes 1961–2020)
Month	Jan	Feb	Mar	Apr	May	Jun	Jul	Aug	Sep	Oct	Nov	Dec	Year
Record high °C (°F)	23.3 (73.9)	25.4 (77.7)	30.0 (86.0)	32.7 (90.9)	35.4 (95.7)	37.7 (99.9)	42.4 (108.3)	40.8 (105.4)	39.0 (102.2)	32.7 (90.9)	28.3 (82.9)	23.8 (74.8)	42.4 (108.3)
Mean daily maximum °C (°F)	5.8 (42.4)	8.4 (47.1)	13.2 (55.8)	18.4 (65.1)	22.8 (73.0)	26.5 (79.7)	28.7 (83.7)	29.0 (84.2)	23.9 (75.0)	18.8 (65.8)	12.8 (55.0)	6.6 (43.9)	17.9 (64.2)
Daily mean °C (°F)	1.1 (34.0)	2.9 (37.2)	7.2 (45.0)	12.2 (54.0)	16.9 (62.4)	20.8 (69.4)	22.6 (72.7)	22.3 (72.1)	17.2 (63.0)	12.1 (53.8)	7.0 (44.6)	2.2 (36.0)	12.0 (53.6)
Mean daily minimum °C (°F)	−2.8 (27.0)	−1.6 (29.1)	2.0 (35.6)	6.2 (43.2)	10.9 (51.6)	14.8 (58.6)	16.4 (61.5)	16.1 (61.0)	11.7 (53.1)	6.9 (44.4)	2.6 (36.7)	−1.4 (29.5)	6.8 (44.2)
Record low °C (°F)	−28.4 (−19.1)	−23.3 (−9.9)	−16.6 (2.1)	−7.0 (19.4)	−1.4 (29.5)	3.4 (38.1)	5.9 (42.6)	3.2 (37.8)	−2.4 (27.7)	−6.1 (21.0)	−15.3 (4.5)	−21.0 (−5.8)	−28.4 (−19.1)
Average precipitation mm (inches)	49.3 (1.94)	50.3 (1.98)	58.6 (2.31)	59.5 (2.34)	92.6 (3.65)	103.1 (4.06)	77.5 (3.05)	66.0 (2.60)	65.3 (2.57)	64.9 (2.56)	54.5 (2.15)	60.6 (2.39)	802.2 (31.58)
Average precipitation days (≥ 0.1 mm)	14.8	13.2	12.6	13.0	14.5	13.1	10.6	8.9	10.8	11.1	11.8	14.5	148.9
Average snowy days	8.5	7.2	4.1	1.0	0.0	0.0	0.0	0.0	0.0	0.2	2.8	6.4	30.2
Average relative humidity (%)	83.1	77.4	70.5	68.6	70.2	69.4	67.3	68.0	74.2	78.8	81.2	83.7	74.4
Mean monthly sunshine hours	71.0	90.8	141.4	170.7	217.2	242.8	273.5	259.3	183.5	142.7	92.1	63.1	1,948.1
Source: Republic Hydrometeorological Service of Serbia

== Society and culture ==
=== Cultural institutions ===
The most important cultural institution is the National Museum founded in 1951, under whose auspices are the Museum of the First and Second Serbian Uprisings and displays in Brankovina. Other institutions include the Institute for Protection of Cultural Monuments, the Historical Archive of Valjevo, the Town Library. The Cultural Centre has a well-equipped stage and an auditorium with 630 seats. The Youth Centre has "Gallery 34" for exhibitions and forums. The Serbian Language and Culture Workshop offers classes in Serbian for foreigners.

Valjevo has two elite art galleries. The Modern Gallery has a permanent display of works of the Academician Ljuba Popović (1953-63 period), a collection of works presented by exhibitors and a concept of representing fantastic painting after the model of the famous "Mediala". The International Art Studio "Radovan Mića Trnavac" exhibits foreign painters of different styles.

The Cultural and Artistic Society "Abrašević" has a renowned choir, along with folk music and drama ensembles. Theatrical performances are given by the private theatre "Mala scena" and the Drama Studio of Valjevo Grammar School.

The Jazz Fest is accompanied by summer literary talks in the Library Yard.

Desanka's May Talks (Desankini majski razgovori) discuss literary topics, where the Desanka Maksimović Foundation grants an annual poetry award.

=== Tešnjar ===
Tešnjar is one of the oldest paved streets in Valjevo. It is used for films based in the past and is one of the places that makes the beautiful town unique.

== Sports ==
Both local football clubs Budućnost Krušik and Radnički Valjevo play in the third tier of Serbian football.

== Economy ==
The main economic activity in the second half of the 20th century was the arms manufacturing firm Krušik, which returned to production after the wars. The Valjevo economy is characterized by small, private companies working in metallurgy, food production and textiles. Austrian company Austrotherm GmbH, Italian company Golden Lady and Slovenian company Gorenje have built production facilities in Valjevo. Another domestic company is Valjevska Pivara, founded in 1860.

The following table gives a preview of total number of registered people employed in legal entities per their core activity (as of 2022):

Activity	Total
Agriculture, forestry and fishing	168
Mining and quarrying	178
Manufacturing	9,962
Electricity, gas, steam and air conditioning supply	502
Water supply; sewerage, waste management and remediation activities	610
Construction	2,467
Wholesale and retail trade, repair of motor vehicles and motorcycles	4,397
Transportation and storage	1,206
Accommodation and food services	966
Information and communication	468
Financial and insurance activities	382
Real estate activities	44
Professional, scientific and technical activities	1,010
Administrative and support service activities	543
Public administration and defense; compulsory social security	1,605
Education	1,747
Human health and social work activities	1,897
Arts, entertainment and recreation	359
Other service activities	622
Individual agricultural workers	1,405
Total	30,539

== Politics ==
Seats in the city parliament won in the 2016 local elections:

Party	Seats
Serbian Progressive Party	26
Socialist Party of Serbia	18
Democratic Party	4
Enough is Enough	3
Source: Local Elections in Serbia 2016

== Demographics ==
Historical population
Year	Pop.	±%
1948	15,830	—
1953	21,165	+33.7%
1961	28,461	+34.5%
1971	39,786	+39.8%
1981	50,114	+26.0%
1991	59,016	+17.8%
2002	61,035	+3.4%
2011	58,932	−3.4%
2022	56,059	−4.9%

According to the 2022 census, the city proper has a population of 56,059, while the administrative area has a population of 82,169.

=== Ethnic groups ===
The ethnic composition of the city of Valjevo:

Ethnic group	Population	%
Serbs	86,423	95.69%
Roma	1,413	1.56%
Montenegrins	135	0.15%
Yugoslavs	105	0.12%
Macedonians	80	0.09%
Croats	72	0.08%
Others	2,084	2.31%
Total	90,312	

== Gallery ==
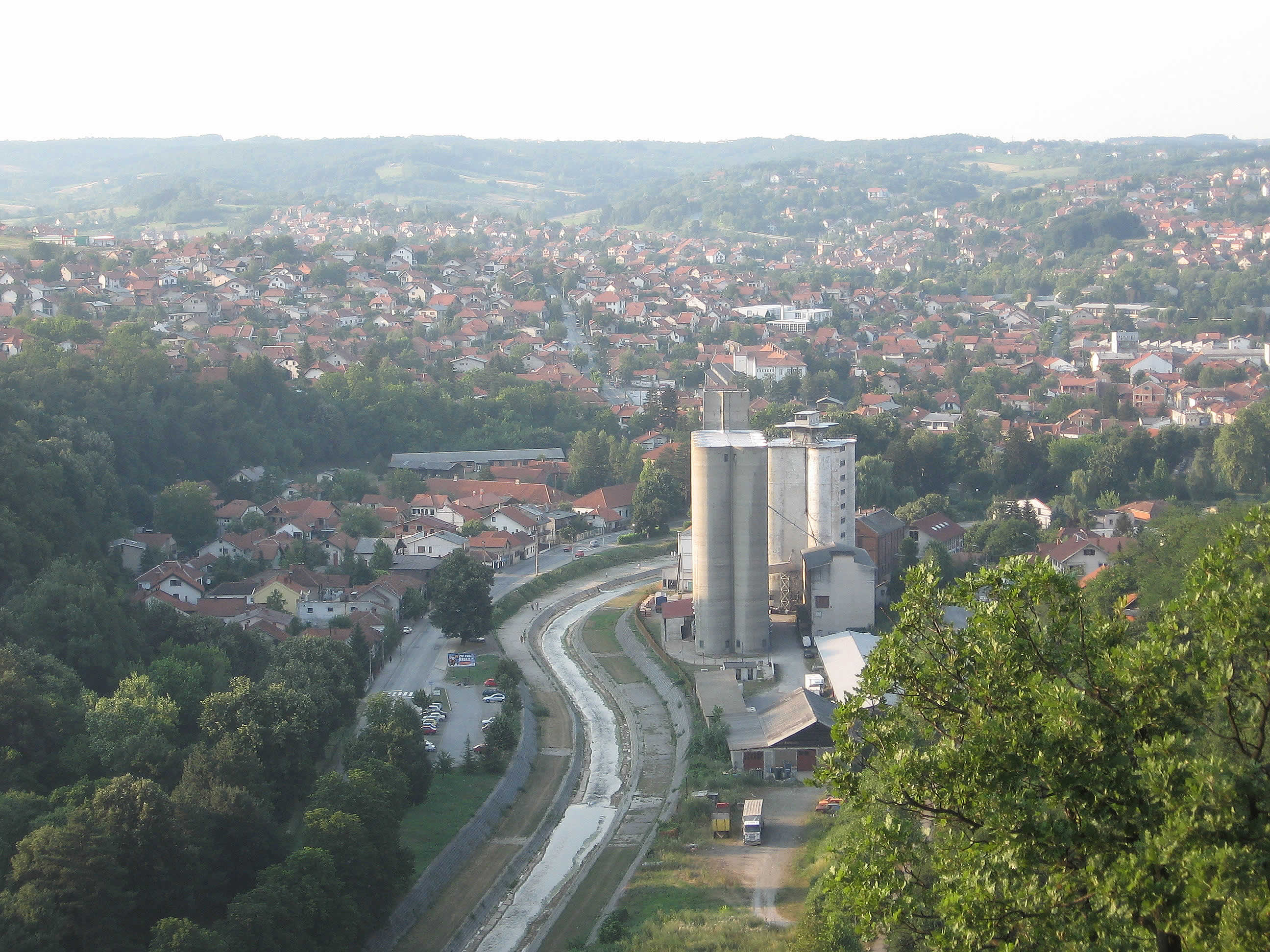
A view of the city from the west. River Kolubara and city wheat silo can be seen

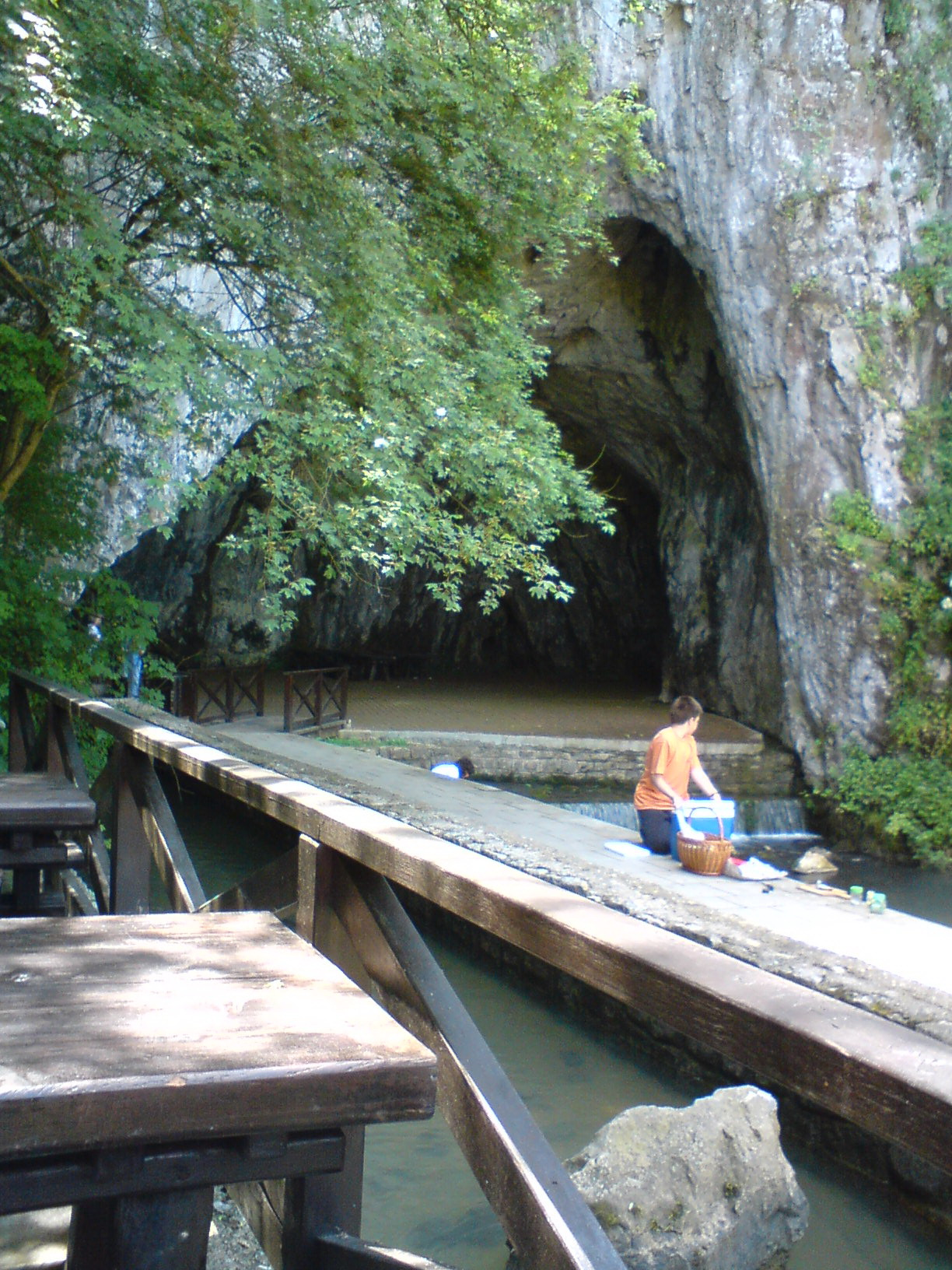
Petnica cave

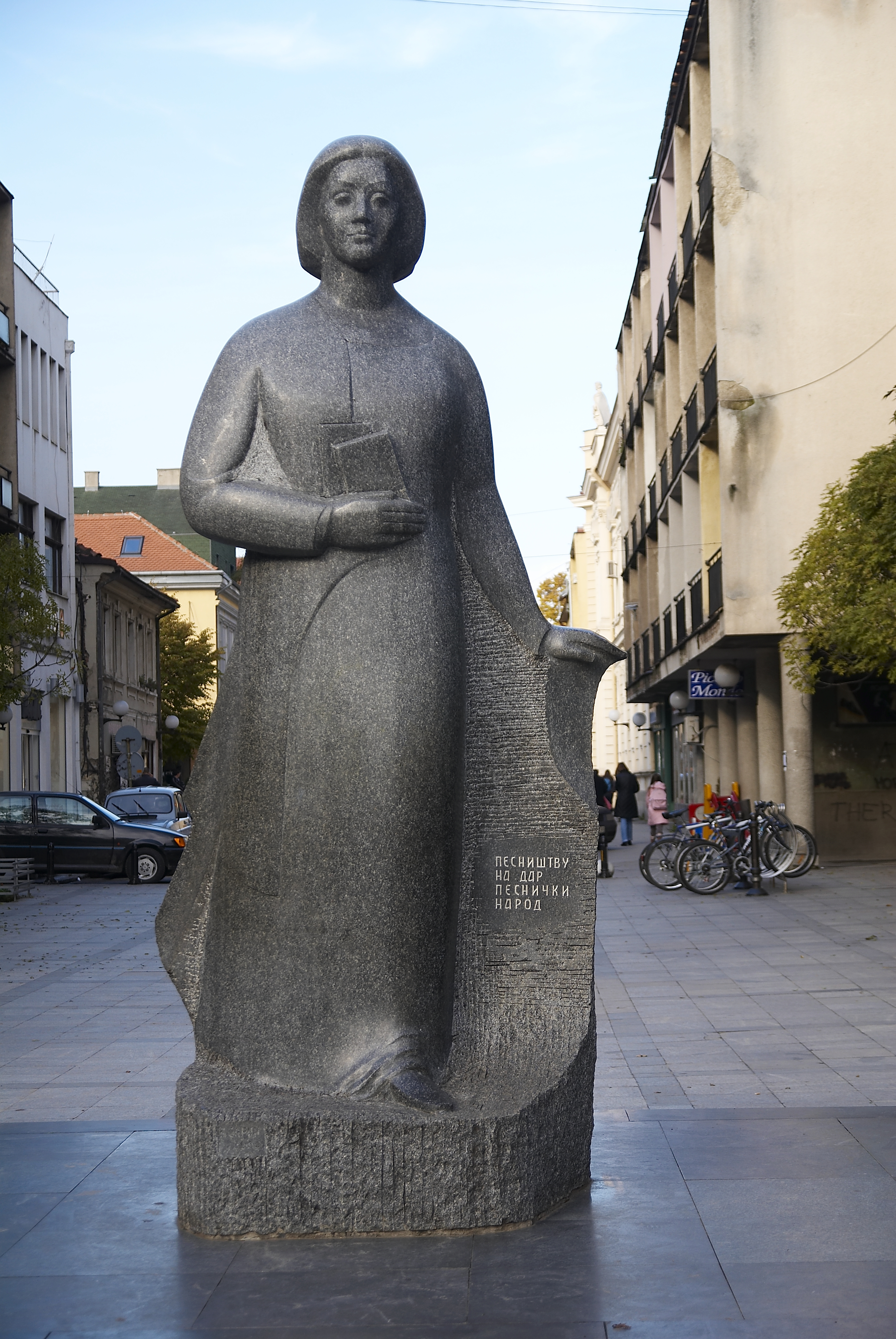
Desanka Maksimović monument

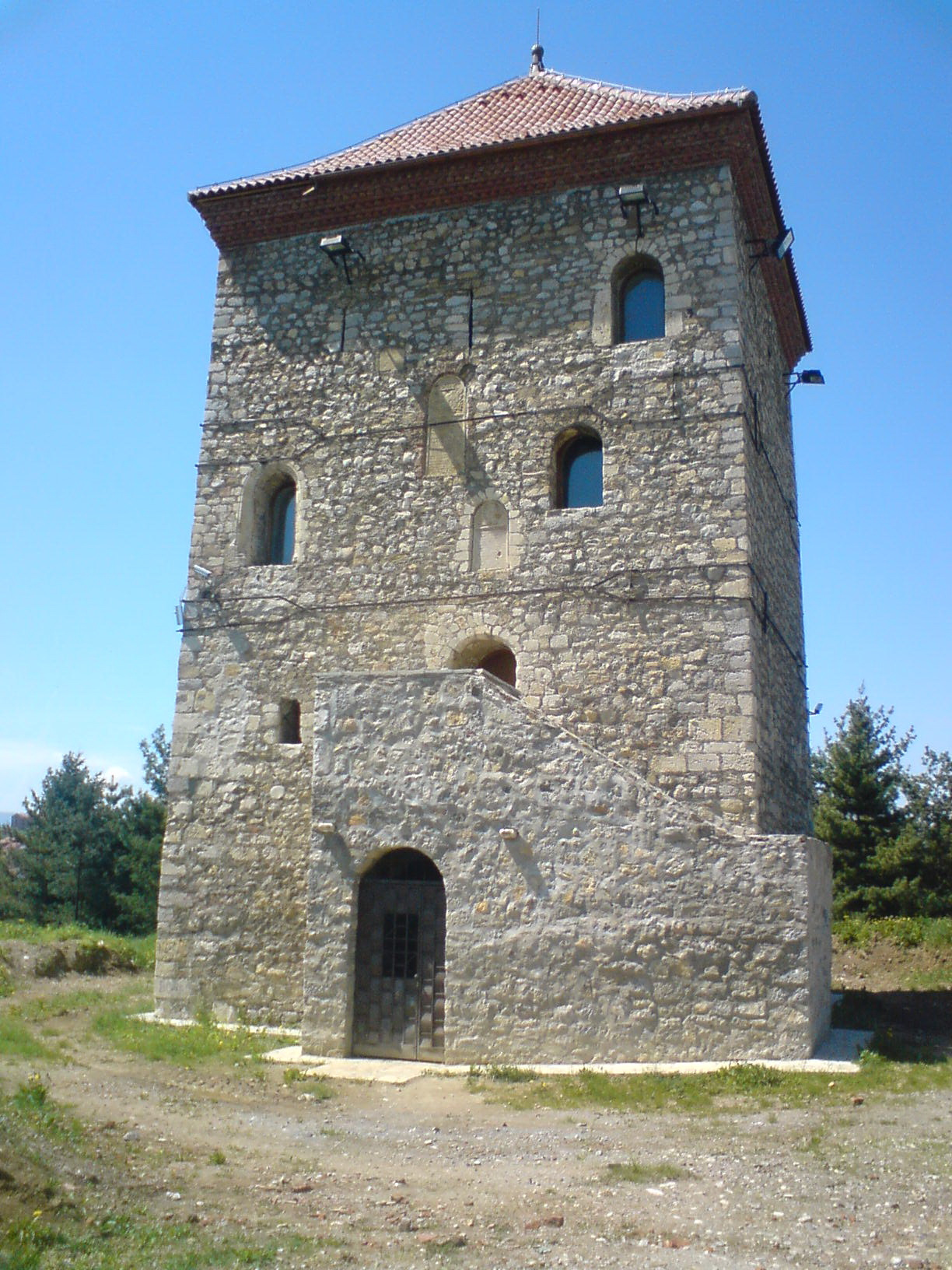
Nenadović Tower from 1813

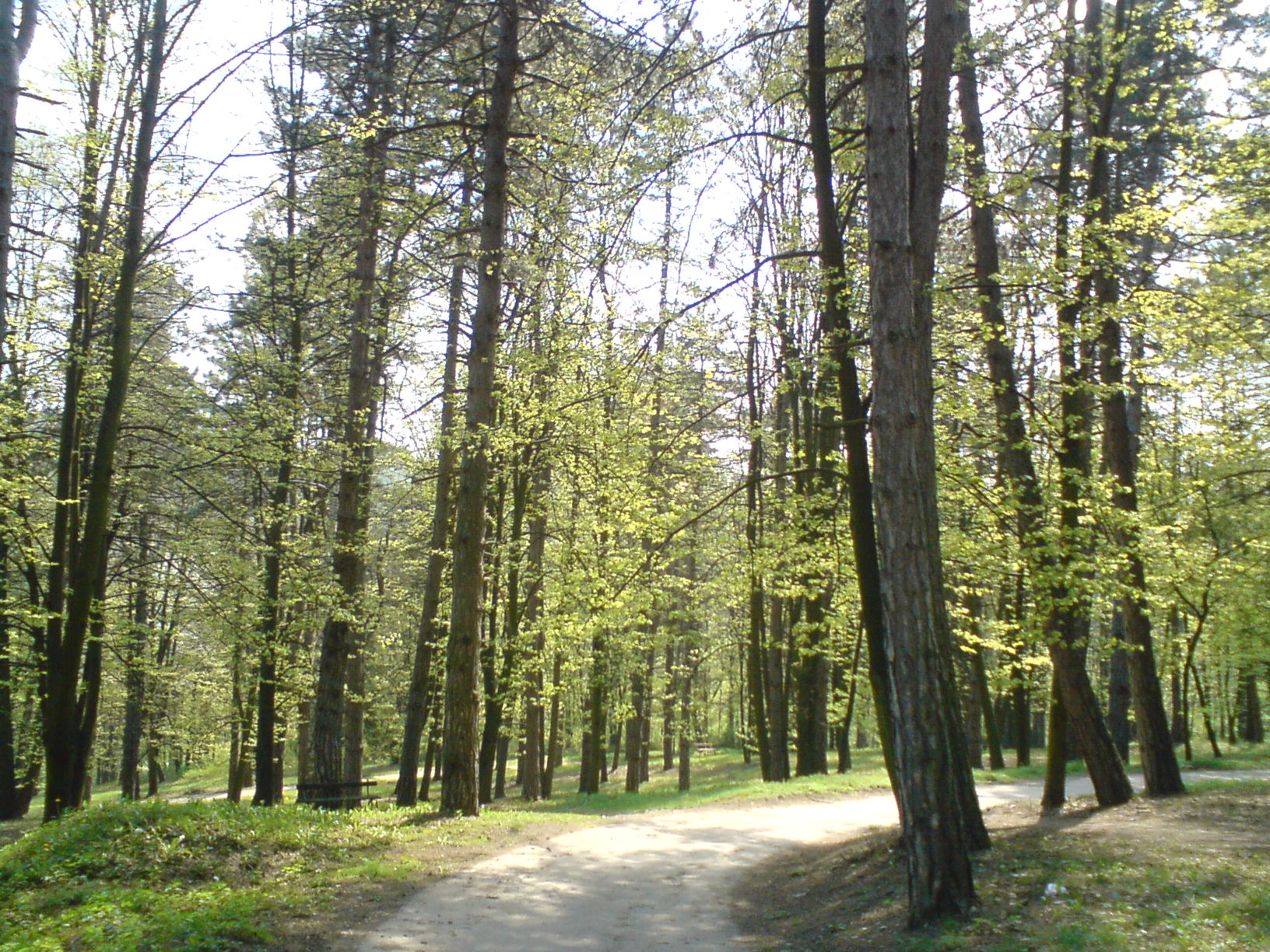
Cave Park

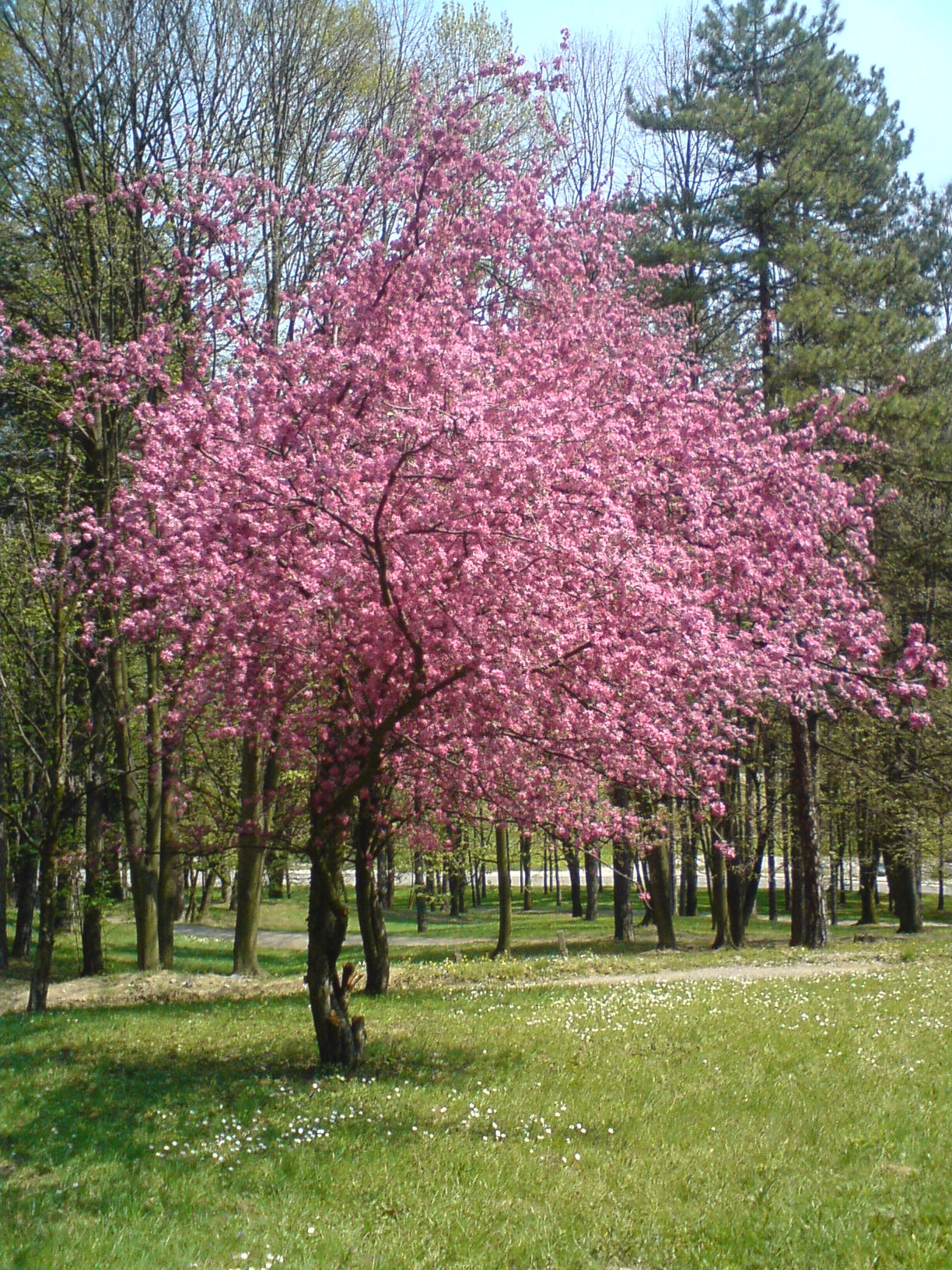
Cave Park

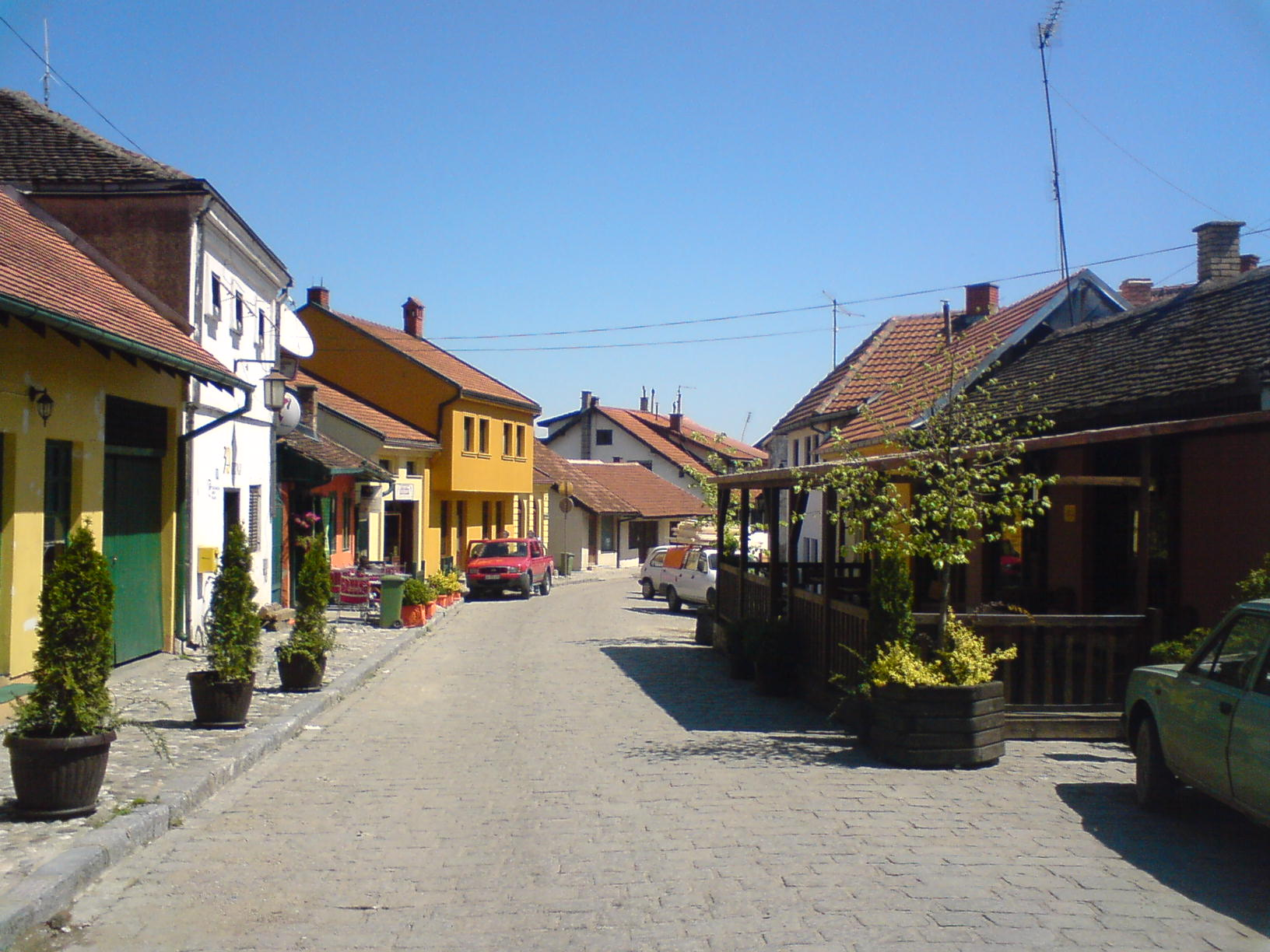
Tešnjar, old urban settlement in Valjevo

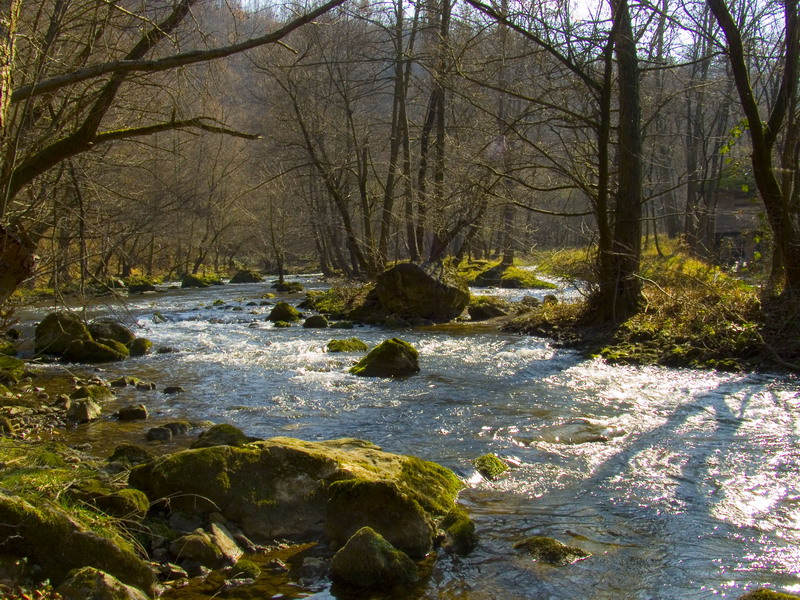
Gradac River near Valjevo

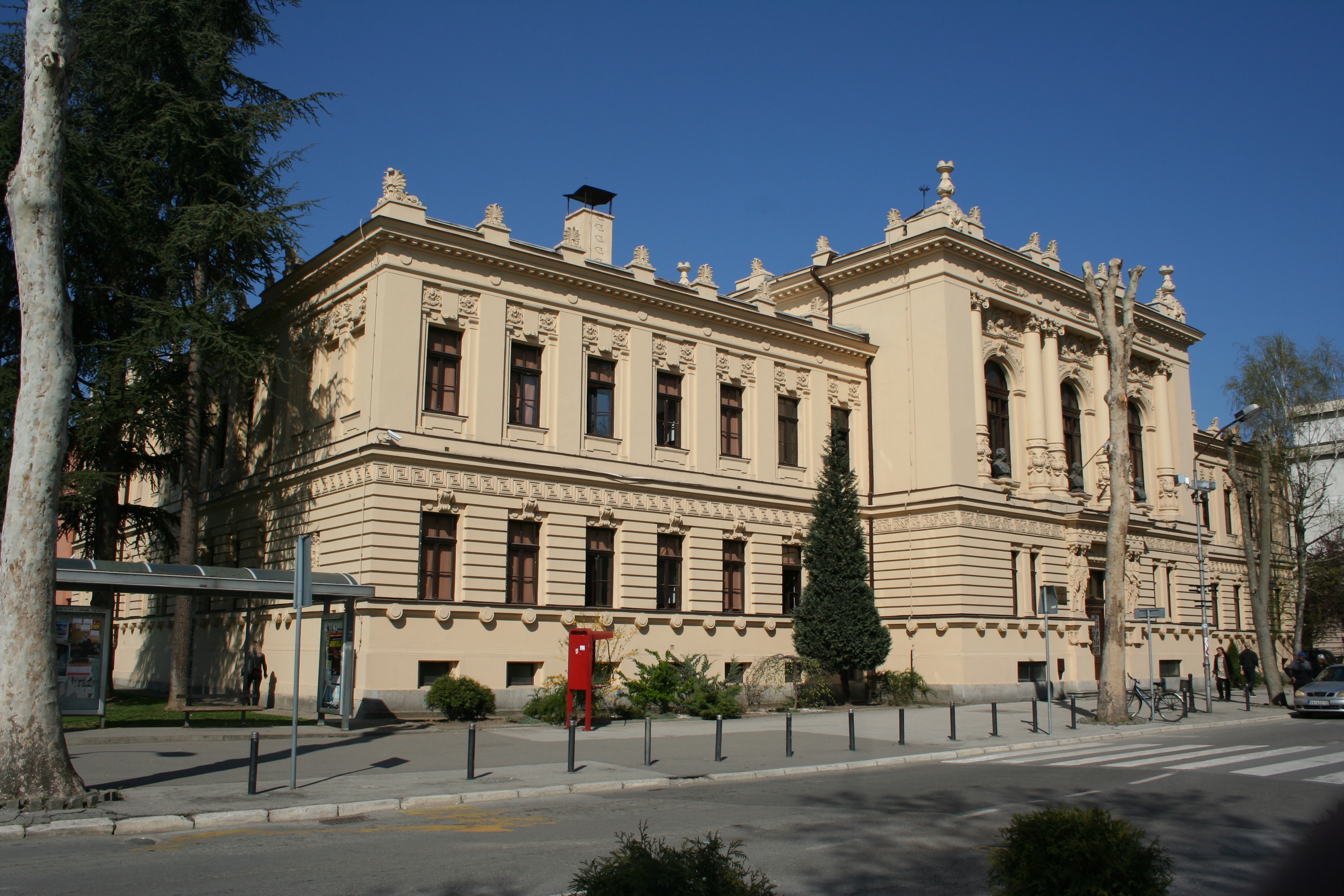
Valjevo Grammar School

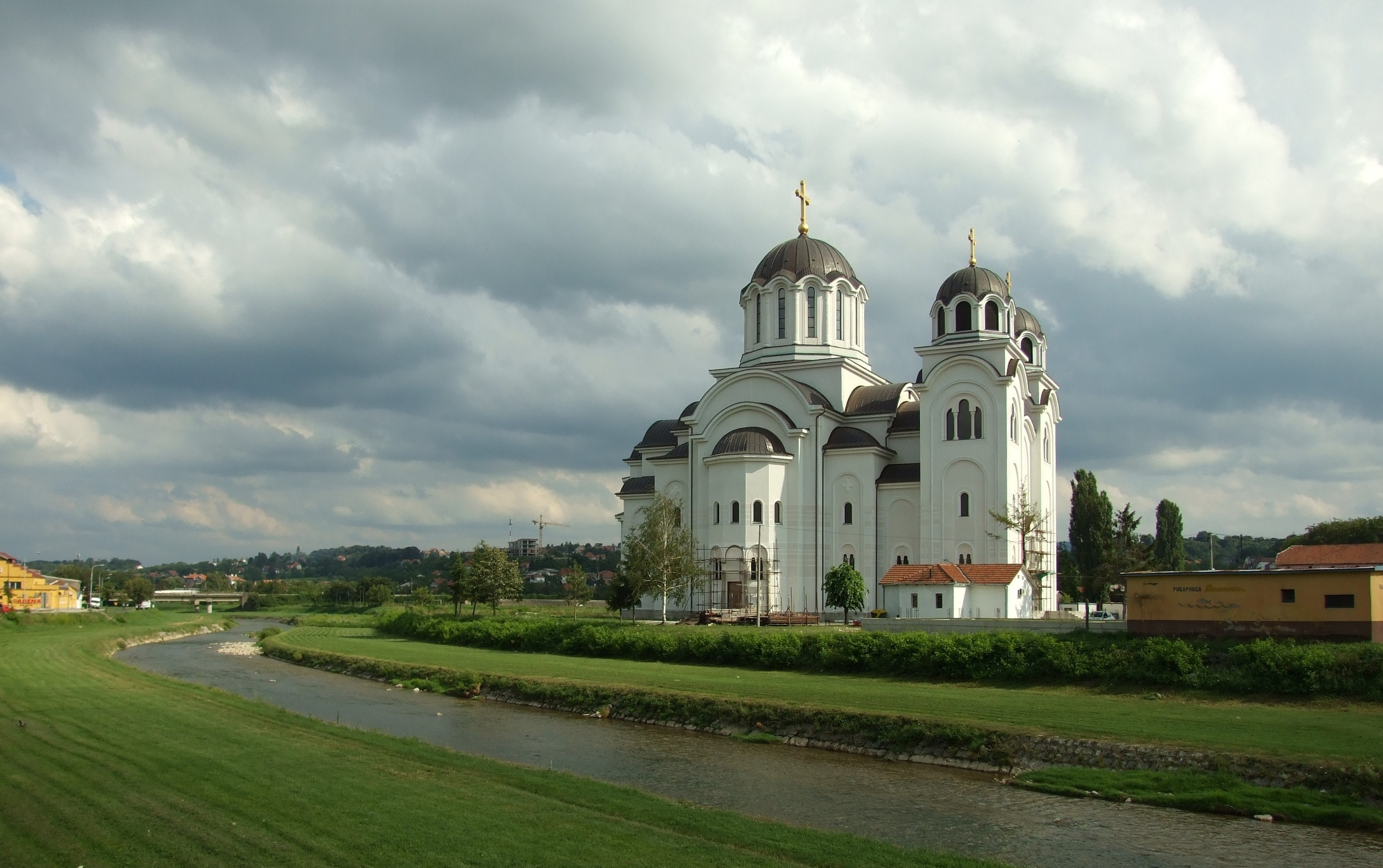
Temple of Our Lord's Resurrection

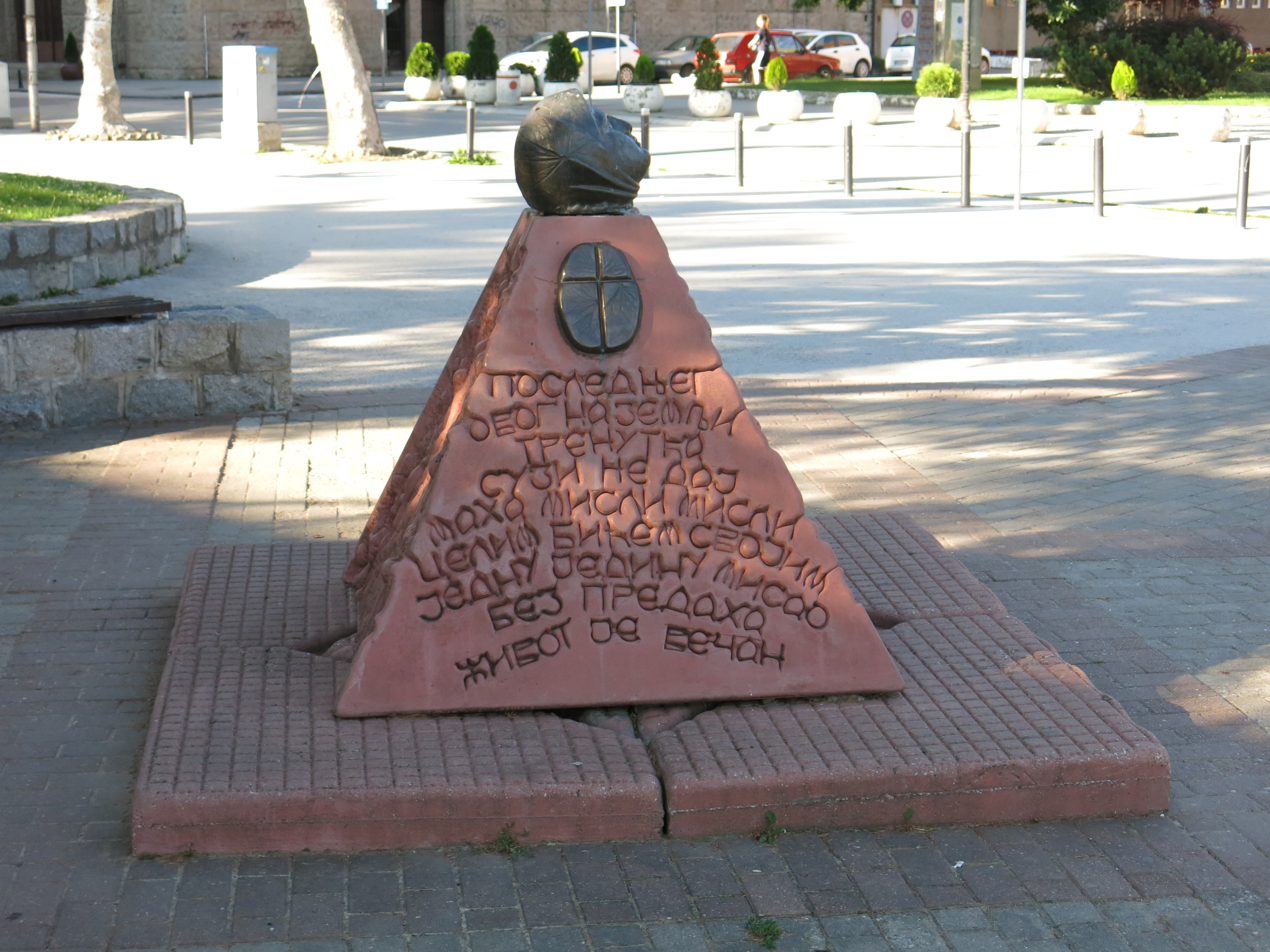
"Mother Serbia", Memorial dedicated to the Slaughter of the Knezes

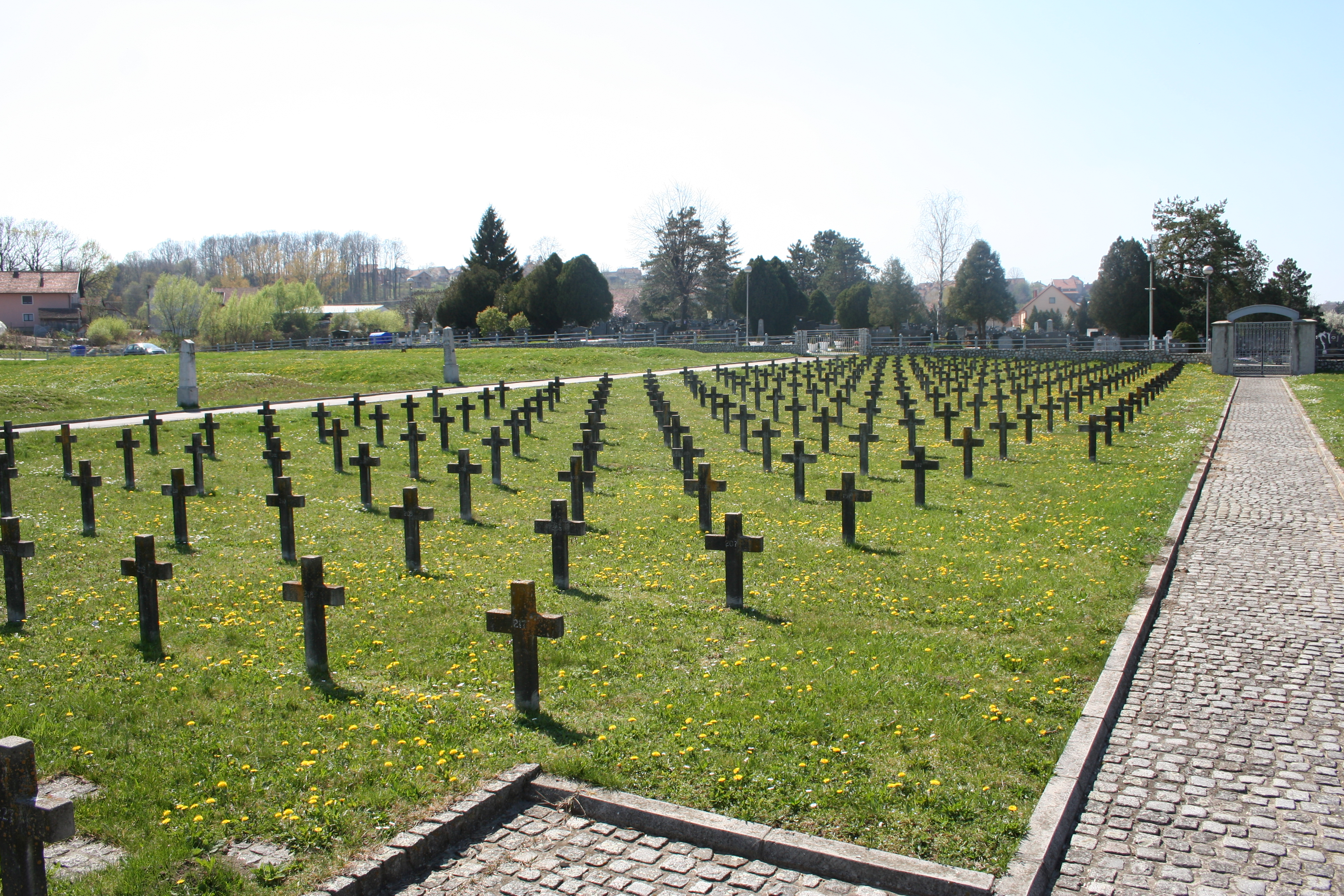
Memorial cemetery to the victims of the World War I
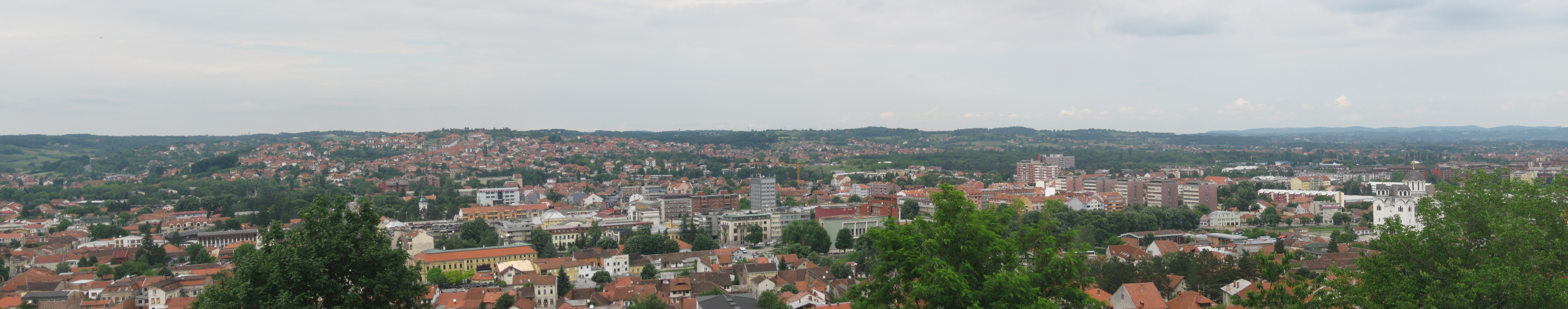
Valjevo Panorama - downtown
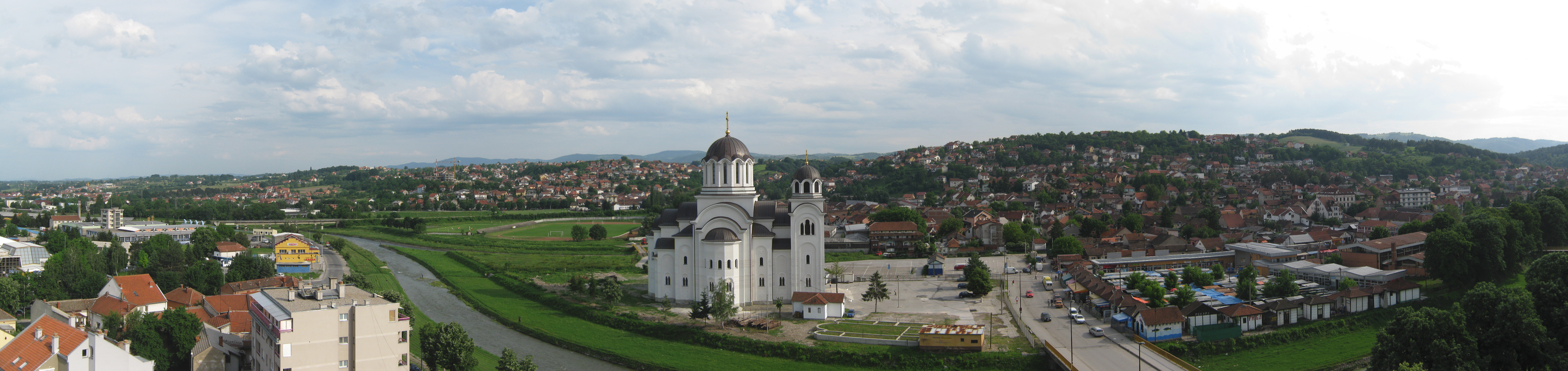
Valjevo Panorama - uptown part of the city and cathedral church

== Notable people ==
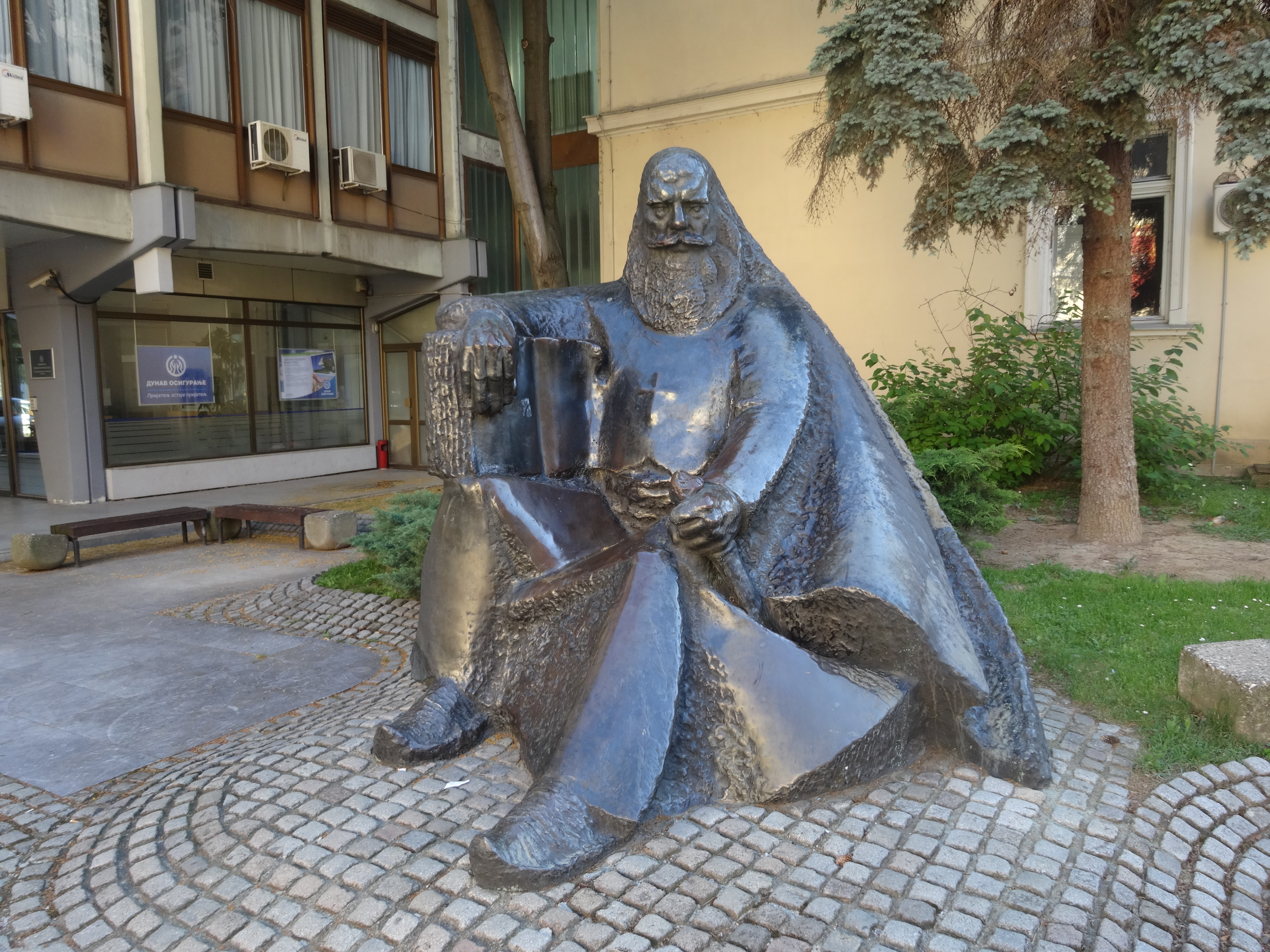
Matija Nenadović's monument in Valjevo

- Serbian singer, songwriter, and producer Željko Joksimović grew up in Valjevo.
- Serbian basketball player Miloš Teodosić was born in Valjevo.
- Draginja Babić (1886–1915) was born in Valjevo and worked at Valjevo Hospital during the Balkan Wars and World War I.
- Gorica Gajević (born 1958), a lawyer and politician born in Valjevo.
- Archaeologist Vladimir Pecikoza was born in Valijevo in 1977.

=== Nenadović family ===
This family produced leaders of the First Serbian Uprising, ministers of the first Serbian government, spiritual leaders and travel writers. Some members are: Voivode Aleksa, Archpriest Mateja Nenadović, Voivode Jakov Nenadović, Sima and Jevrem, writer Čika Ljuba Nenadović, and Princess Persida Karađorđević, the mother of King Peter I of Serbia.

== International cooperation ==
Valjevo has official sister cities:

	Country	City	Date
(Slovakia)	Slovakia	Prievidza, Trenčín Region	
(Germany)	Germany	Pfaffenhofen, Bavaria	
(Netherlands)	Netherlands	Sittard, Limburg	

== See also ==
- List of populated places in Serbia
