= Majinović =

- Village (Selo)
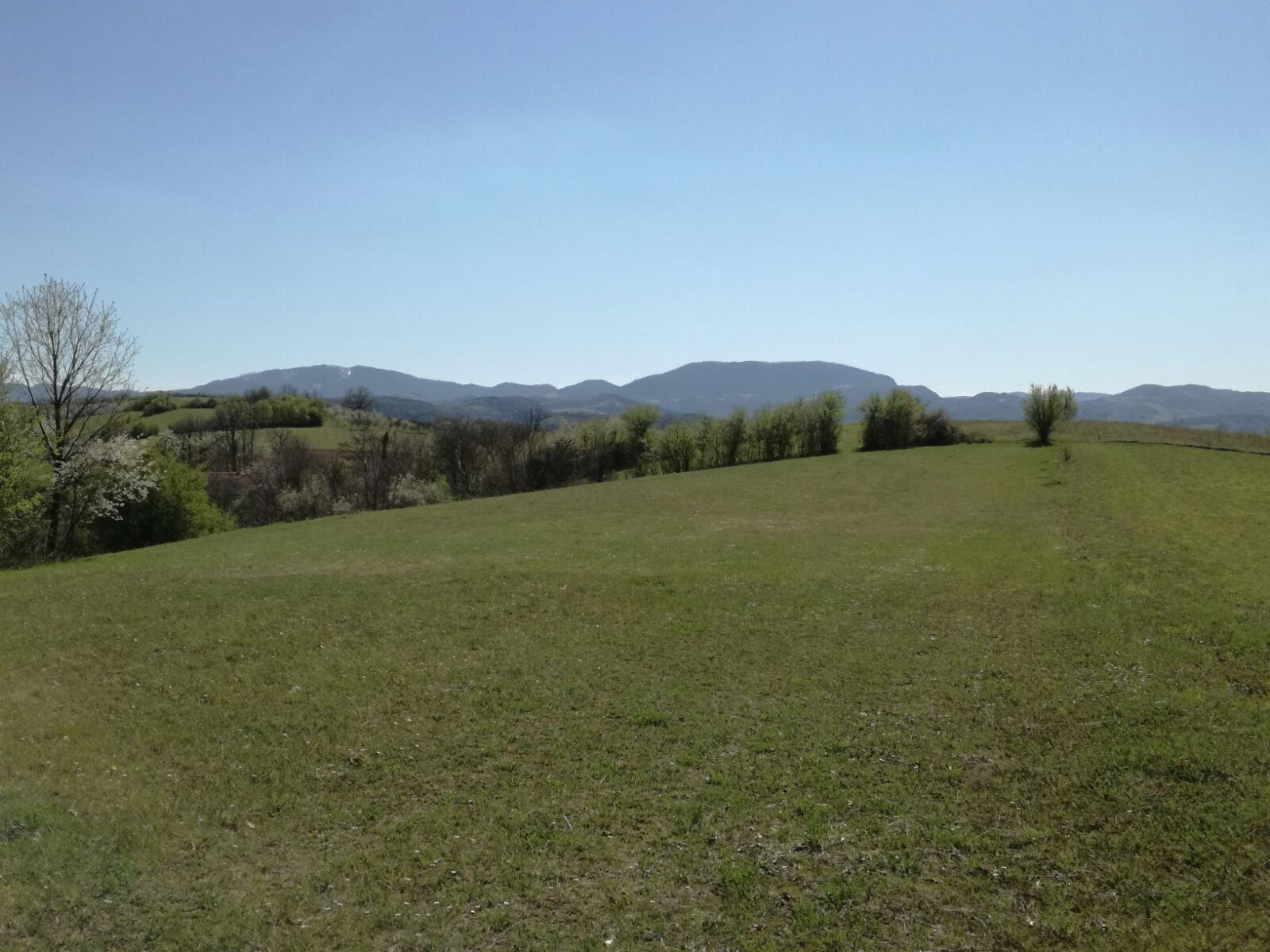

- Location within Serbia
- Coordinates: 44°17′09″N 19°43′08″E
- Country: Serbia
- District: Kolubara District
- Municipality: Valjevo

Population (2002)
  - Total: 163
- Time zone: UTC+1 (CET)
  - Summer (DST): UTC+2 (CEST)
- Area code: 014

Majinović is a village in the municipality of Valjevo, Serbia. According to the 2002 census, the village has a population of 163 people.
