= Tešnjar =

Coordinates: 44°16′4″N 19°53′4″E

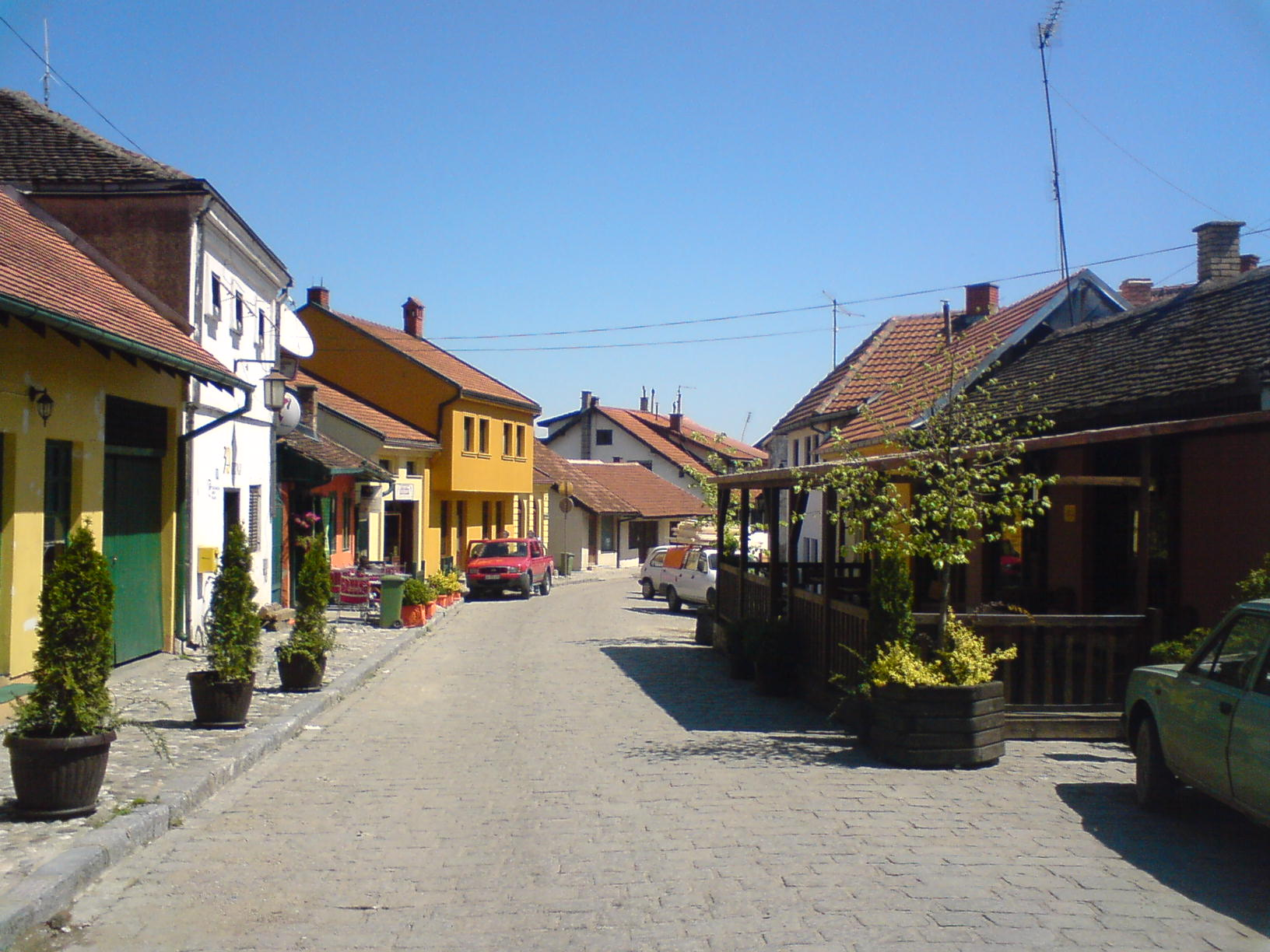
Tešnjar

Tešnjar (Serbian Cyrillic: Тешњар) is the old quarter of the city of Valjevo, in Serbia. It originated in the 19th century and was a long time trade center, located on the right bank of Kolubara. It consists of one street that follows the Kolubara river course and several smaller streets below the hill. The name is probably received after the tight streets. Tešnjar has become famous lately due to Serbian cinema. On weekends, Tešnjar serves as the youth's main place for a pub crawl since there are many bohemian-style pubs. It is declared a Cultural Heritage of Serbia.

== See also ==
- Valjevo
- Spatial Cultural-Historical Units of Great Importance
