= Zlatarić, Valjevo =

Zlatarić Златарић
- Village
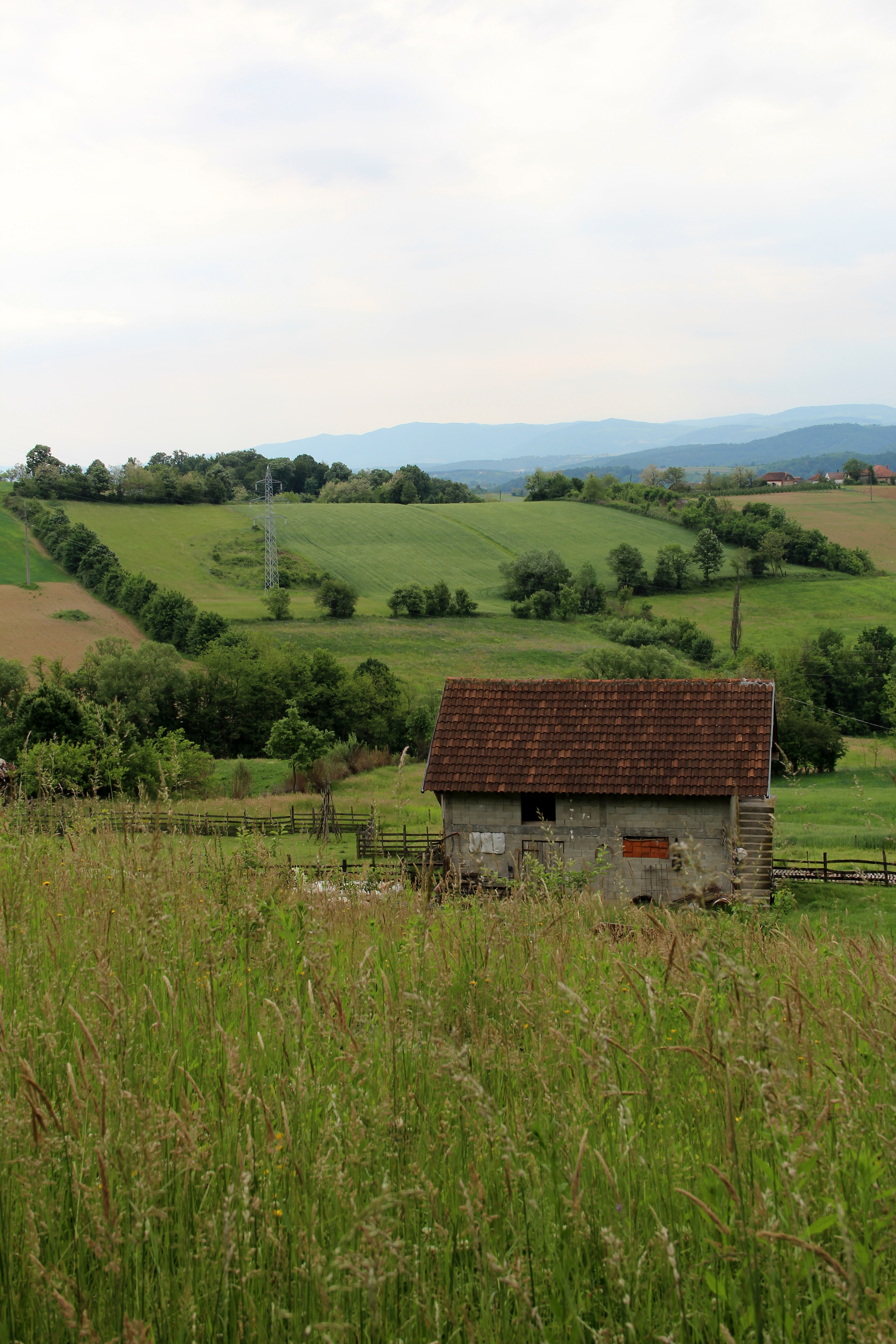

- Location within Serbia
- Coordinates: 44°16′50″N 19°48′34″E
- Country: Serbia
- Region: Šumadija and Western Serbia
- District: Kolubara
- Municipality: Valjevo
- Elevation: 768 ft (234 m)

Population (2011)
  - Total: 402
- Time zone: UTC+1 (CET)
  - Summer (DST): UTC+2 (CEST)

Zlatarić is a village in the municipality of Valjevo, Serbia. According to the 2011 census, the village has a population of 402 inhabitants.

== Population ==
Population of Zlatarić
| 1948 | 1953 | 1961 | 1971 | 1981 | 1991 | 2002 | 2011 |
| 641 | 643 | 687 | 596 | 563 | 529 | 486 | 402 |
