= Petnica =

Petnica Петница
- Village (Selo)
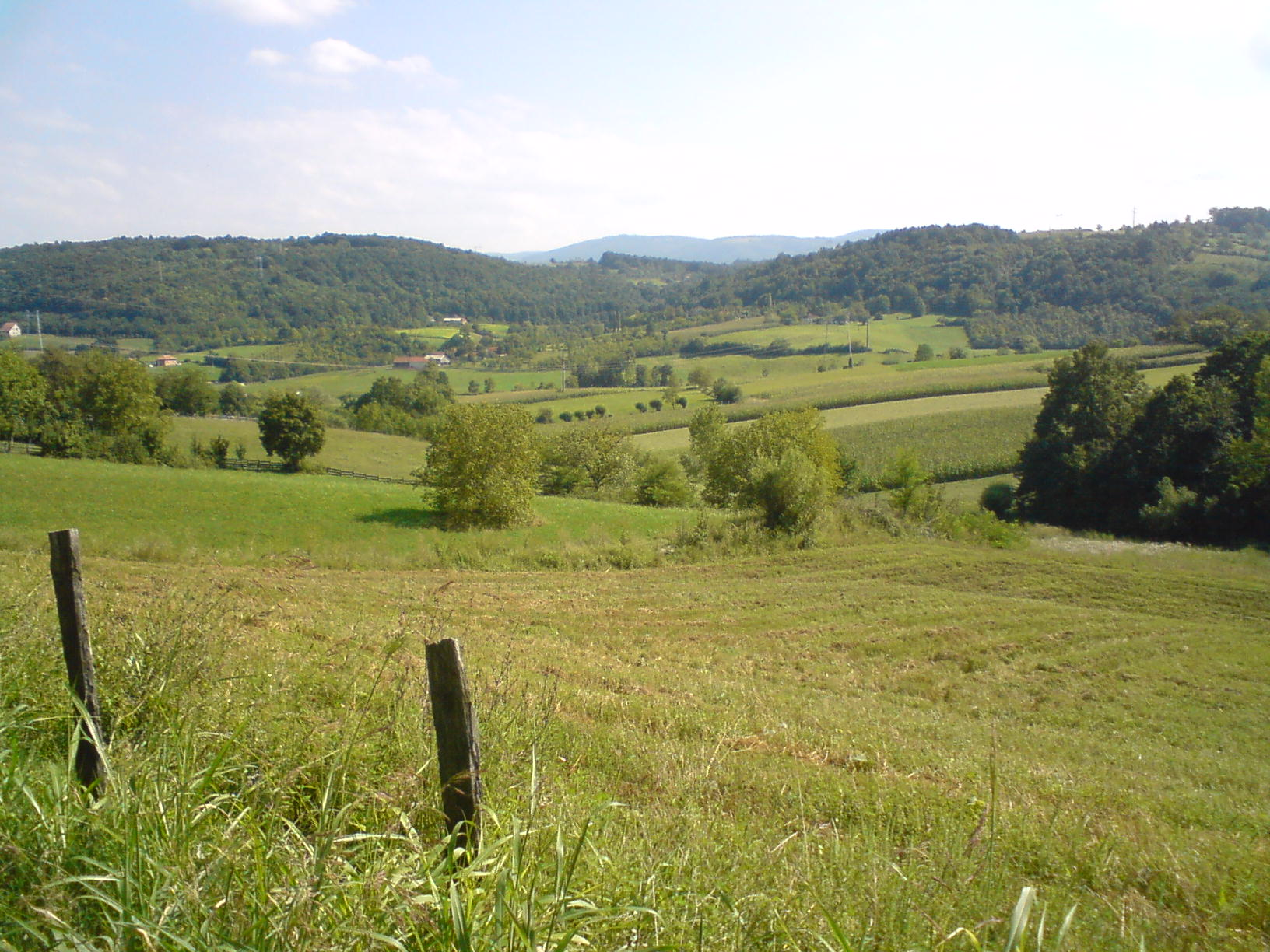
- Petnica

- Location within Serbia Petnica (Europe)
- Coordinates: 44°14′50″N 19°55′51″E
- Country: Serbia
- Municipalities: Valjevo
- District: Kolubara
- Highest elevation: 338 m (1,109 ft)
- Lowest elevation: 163 m (535 ft)

Population (2022)
  - Total: 682
- Time zone: UTC+1 (CET)
  - Summer (DST): UTC+2 (CEST)
- Postal code: 14104
- Area code: +381(0)14
- Car plates: VA

Petnica (Serbian Cyrillic: Петница, Serbian pronunciation: [pětnitsa]) is a small village near Valjevo in the Kolubara District, Serbia. According to the 2022 census, the village has a population of 682 inhabitants.

== Etymology ==
According to local accounts and linguistic records, the village was originally called Pećinica or Pećnica from "pećina" (cave) or a term for a stream flowing out of a cave. According to the theory, phonetic shifts softened the name into Petnjica and eventually Petnica.

Another theory suggests the name Petnjica was brought to the Valjevo area by settlers migrating from Petnjica in Montenegro.

The village was first documented as Petnica in the 1488 Petnica Psalter. During parts of the Ottoman era, it was temporarily recorded as Muratovac after a local sipahi.

== Geography ==
The village is located near Valjevo.The closest neighbouring places are Klinci, Beloševac, Žabari, Zarube, Dračić, Bujačić, Degurić and Gorić. The postal code of the village is 14104. Petnica belongs to the Valjevo Karst, positioned near the Bačevac Karst to the east and the Lelić Karst toward the west. The terrain is primarily of limestone, creating subterranean and surface karst features including caves, including the Petnica Cave.

== History ==
=== Early history ===
The Petnica Cave has been inhabited since the Paleolithic age consisting of Ice Age fauna, Neolithic settlements and ancient artifacts.

Archaeological excavations have uncovered Roman military gear, tools, and a rare ritual vessel from late antiquity. During the Middle Ages, the cave served as a refuge for local populations.

=== Foundation ===
The village was first documented in 1488 in the Petnica Psalter, which also mentions a local Orthodox monastery and school. The medieval Petnica Monastery was burnt down by the Ottomans in the 18th century most notably during Kočina Krajina in 1788. The church was rebuilt and renovated in the Byzantine style in 1864.

Secular education in the area outside of Valjevo began in Petnica around 1790, with a formal primary school established in 1818 by priest and teacher Alimpije Samouković. A modern school building was later built in 1898 by teacher Milan Hadžić.

=== 20th century ===
The school and village suffered through multiple regional conflicts, with the school building being burnt down by German forces in October 1941.

The Petnica Science Center was founded in 1982, built on the church land near the old school site.

In 1990, the artificial Petnica Lake (Pocibrava) and the Petnica Sports and Recreation Center were created, which caused a rise in tourism for the village.

=== Archaeological discoveries ===
When digging foundations for the Petnica Science Center buildings, excavators discovered the remains of the old cemetery in Petnica ("Bobija") that were transferred to today's church. Today, in the research station in Petnica, there are still two of the three school buildings constructed in 1925.

== Demographics ==
=== Gender (2022 census) ===
- Males: 325
- Females: 357

== Historical population ==
Petnica had a population increase from 1948 to 2011 due to its proximity to Valjevo and the development of local institutions.

Historical population
| Year | Pop. | ±% |
|---|---|---|
| 1948 | 360 | — |
| 1953 | 401 | +11.4% |
| 1961 | 408 | +1.7% |
| 1971 | 439 | +7.6% |
| 1981 | 414 | −5.7% |
| 1991 | 482 | +16.4% |
| 2002 | 614 | +27.4% |
| 2011 | 697 | +13.5% |
| 2022 | 682 | −2.2% |
Source: Statistical Office of the Republic of Serbia (RZS)

== Landmarks ==
=== Petnica Cave ===
Petnica Cave is a cave and archaeological site. The cave and its immediate surroundings are the oldest evidence of the life of people in western Serbia. Archaeological research of the site began in the 19th century when the first research was performed by Josif Pančić and Jovan Cvijić. In addition to archaeological value, the cave has great speleological and paleontological value. The cave consists of a nearly 600-metre-long channel and a number of chambers. It is divided into two parts – The Upper and Lower cave.

=== Archaeological site Petnica ===
Archaeological site Petnica, archaeological-anthropological research conducted in 1969 confirmed that the archaeological site, which is located in front of the entrance to the cave Petnica, is the first complete neolithic habitat in Serbia, some 6,000 years old. The second site, discovered inside the cave, contained the fire pit, bones of Cave bear, Hyena, buck, and parts of military equipment from the Romans (including a game to play), and remains of medieval refuge of the local population. Material from explorations and excavation of the cave contained number of weapons and the remains of pottery dishes that were used by neolithic people.

=== Petnica Lake ===
Petnica Lake (Pocibrava), a body of water for swimming and fishing.

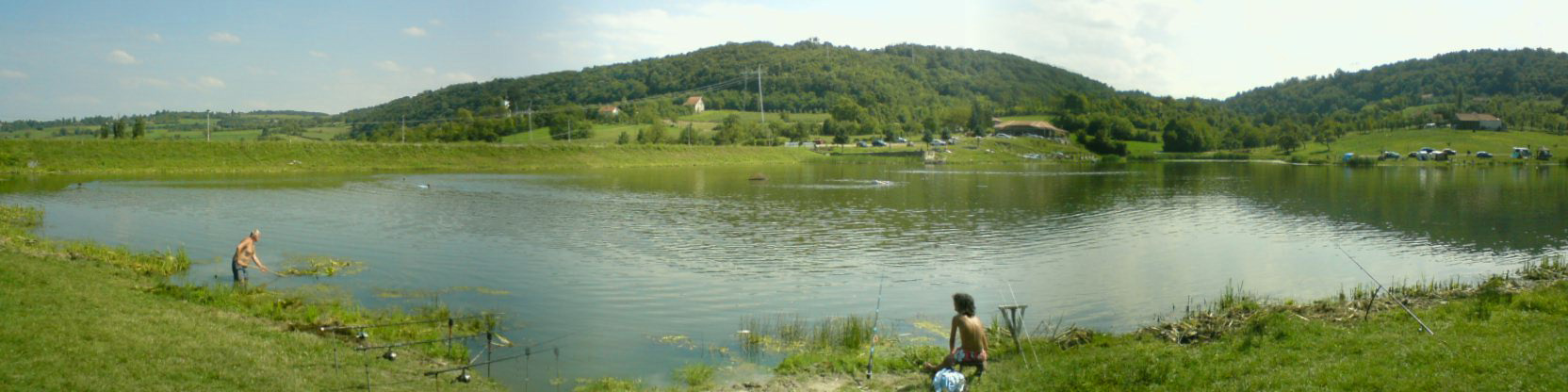
Panorama – Fishing on Lake Petnica (Pocibrava)

- Petnica Science Center
- Petnica Swimming Pool Complex
- Water bottling plant

== Gallery ==
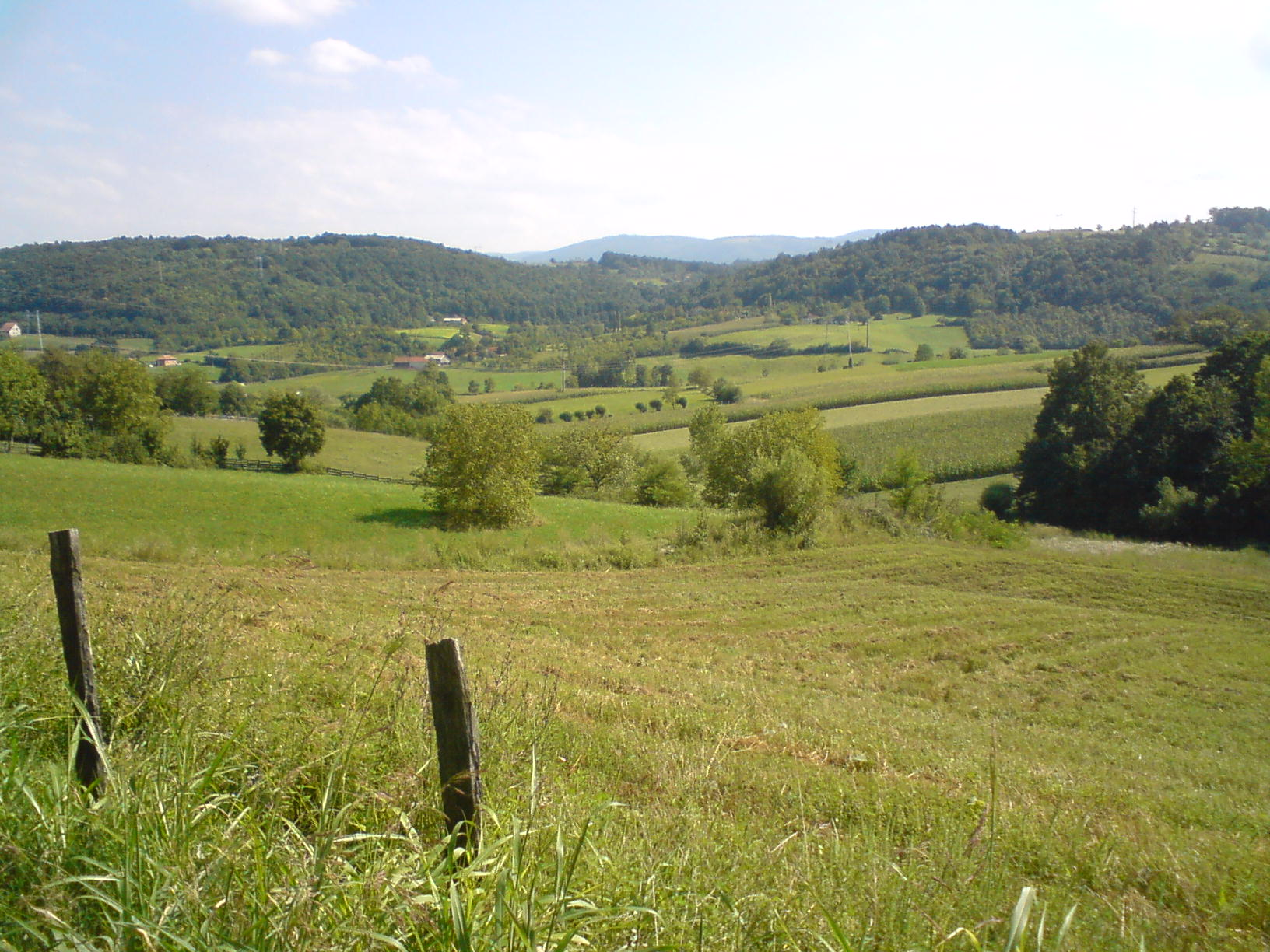
Petnica (Петница)

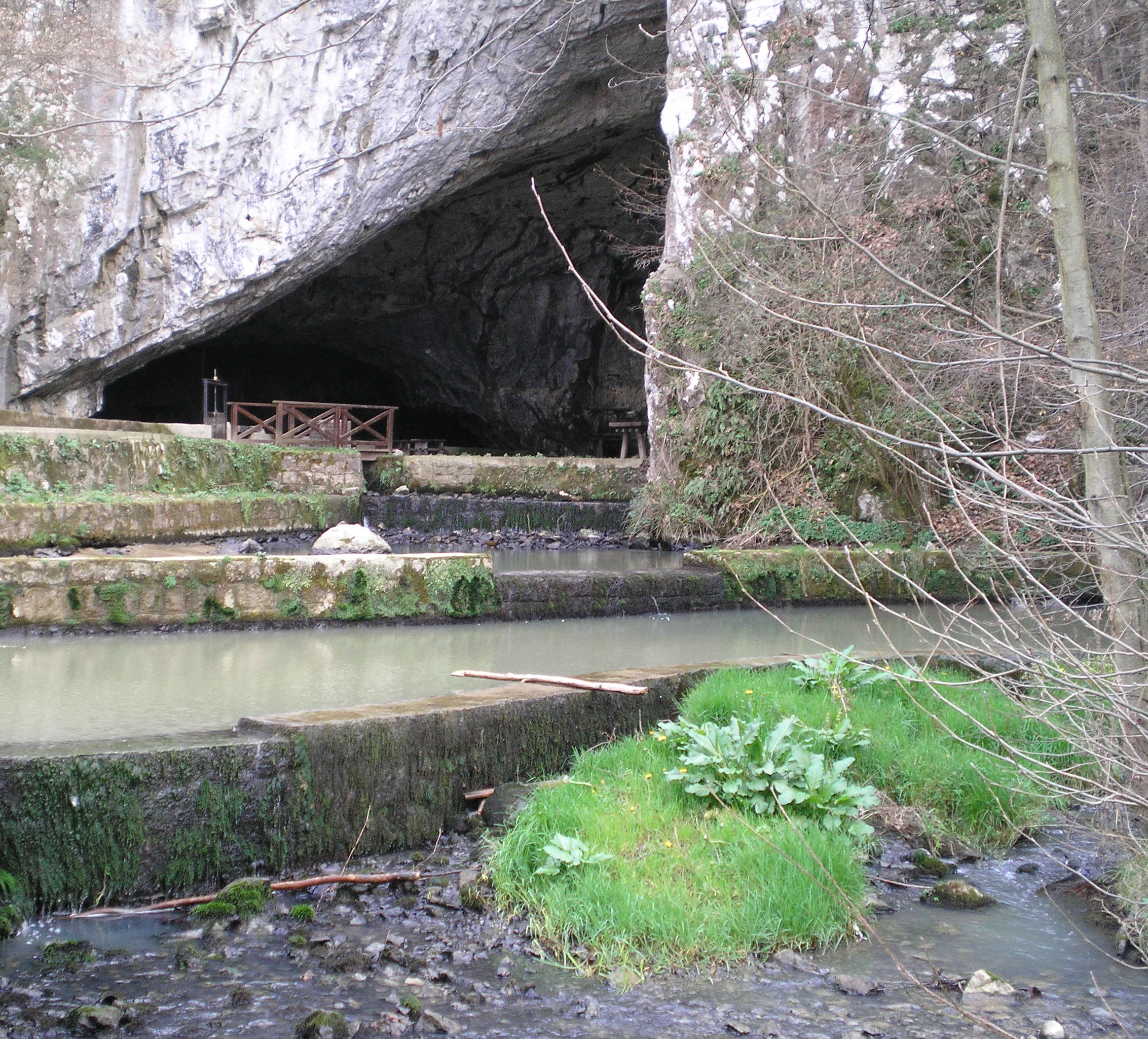
Petnica cave (Петничка Пећина)

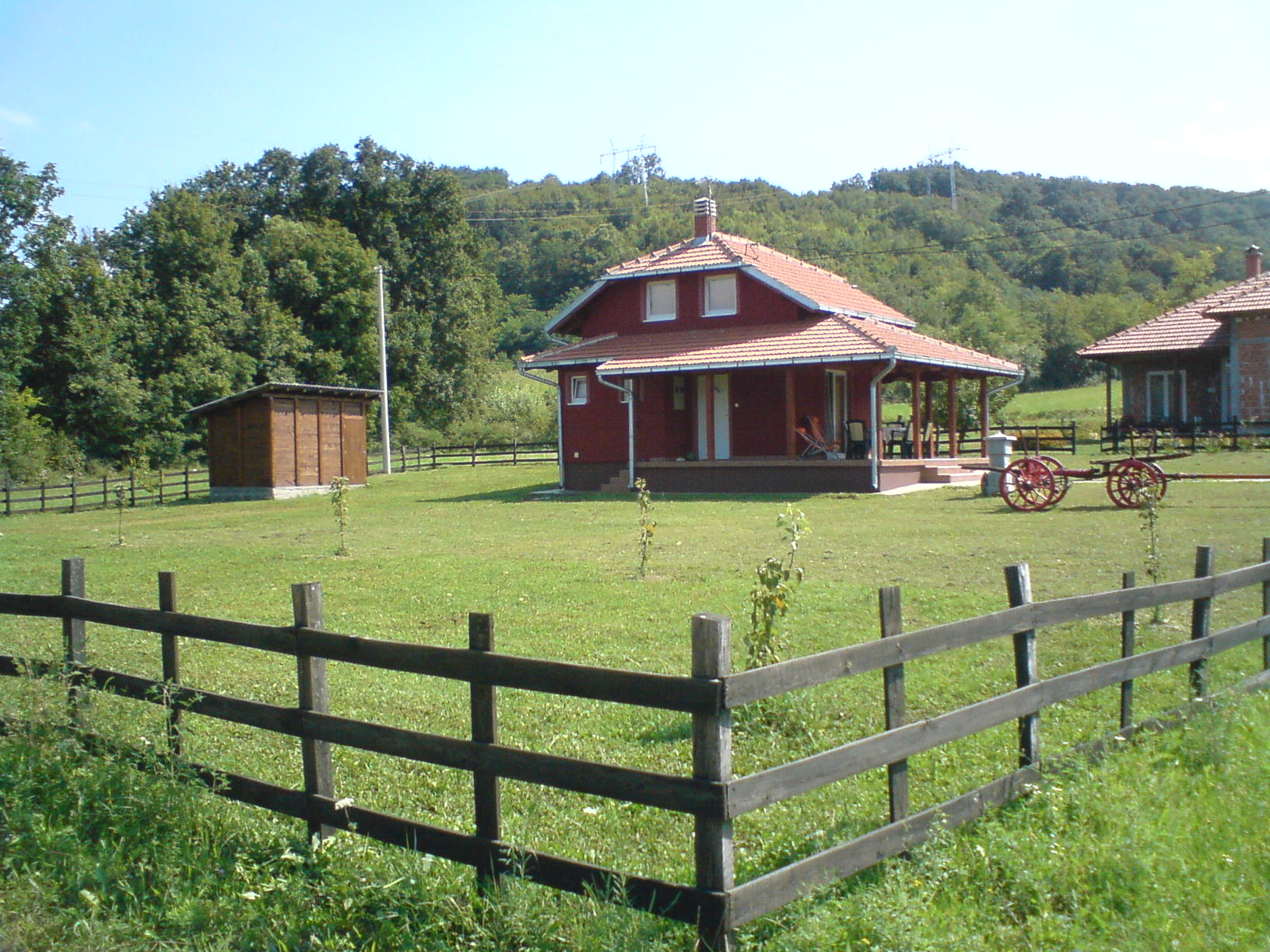
Weekend cottage in Petnica (Викендица)

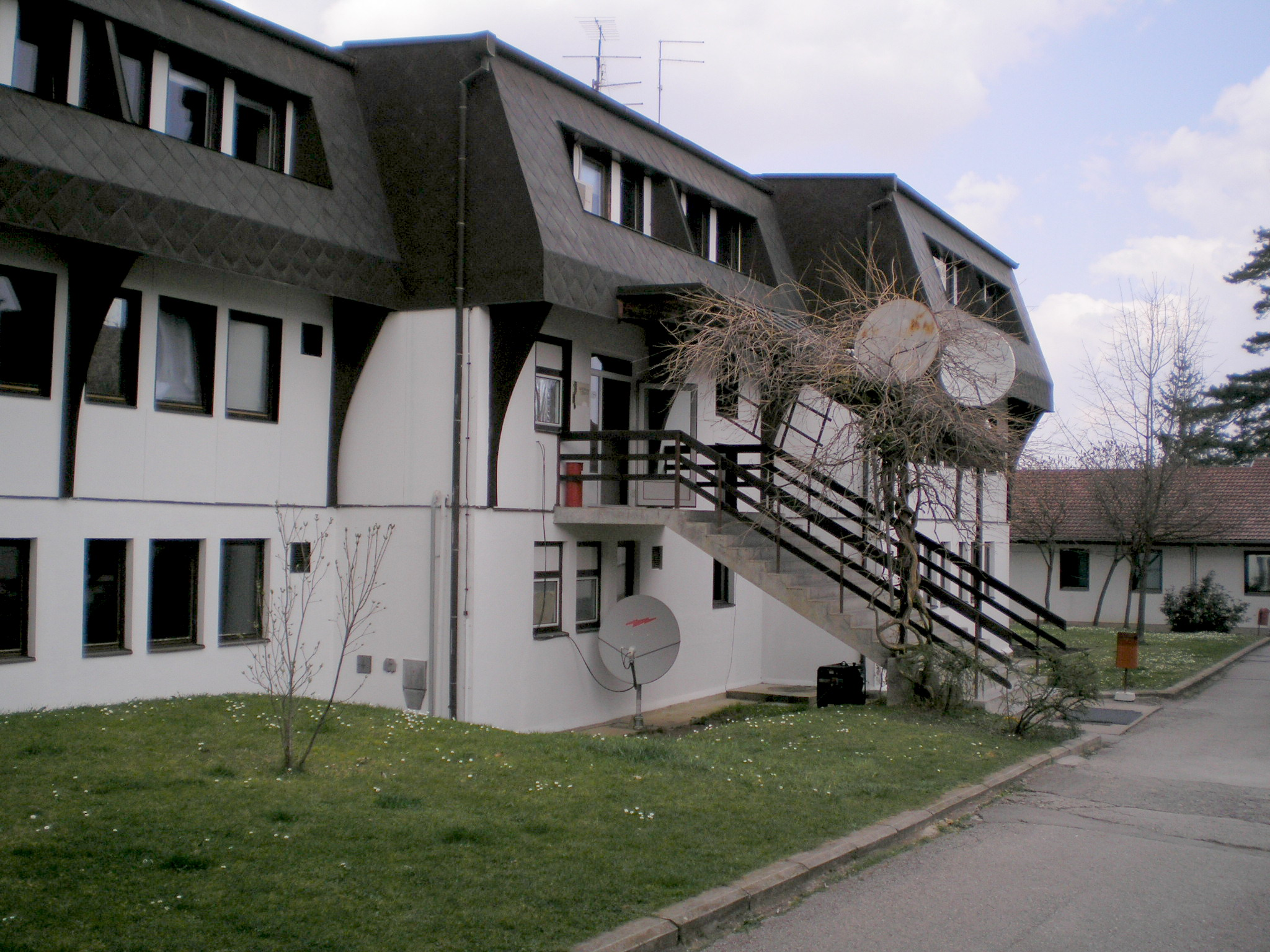
Petnica Science Centre

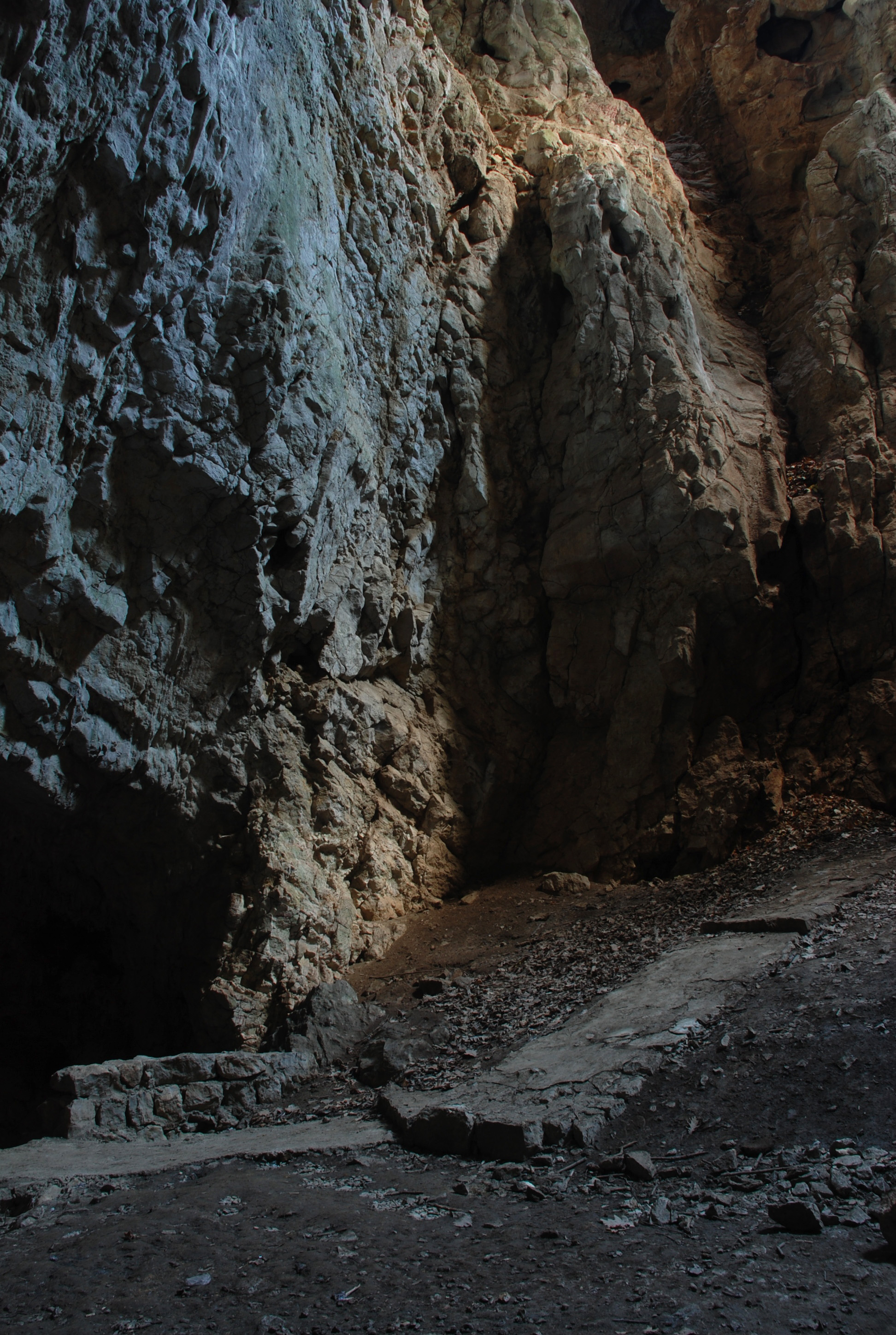
Petnica cave

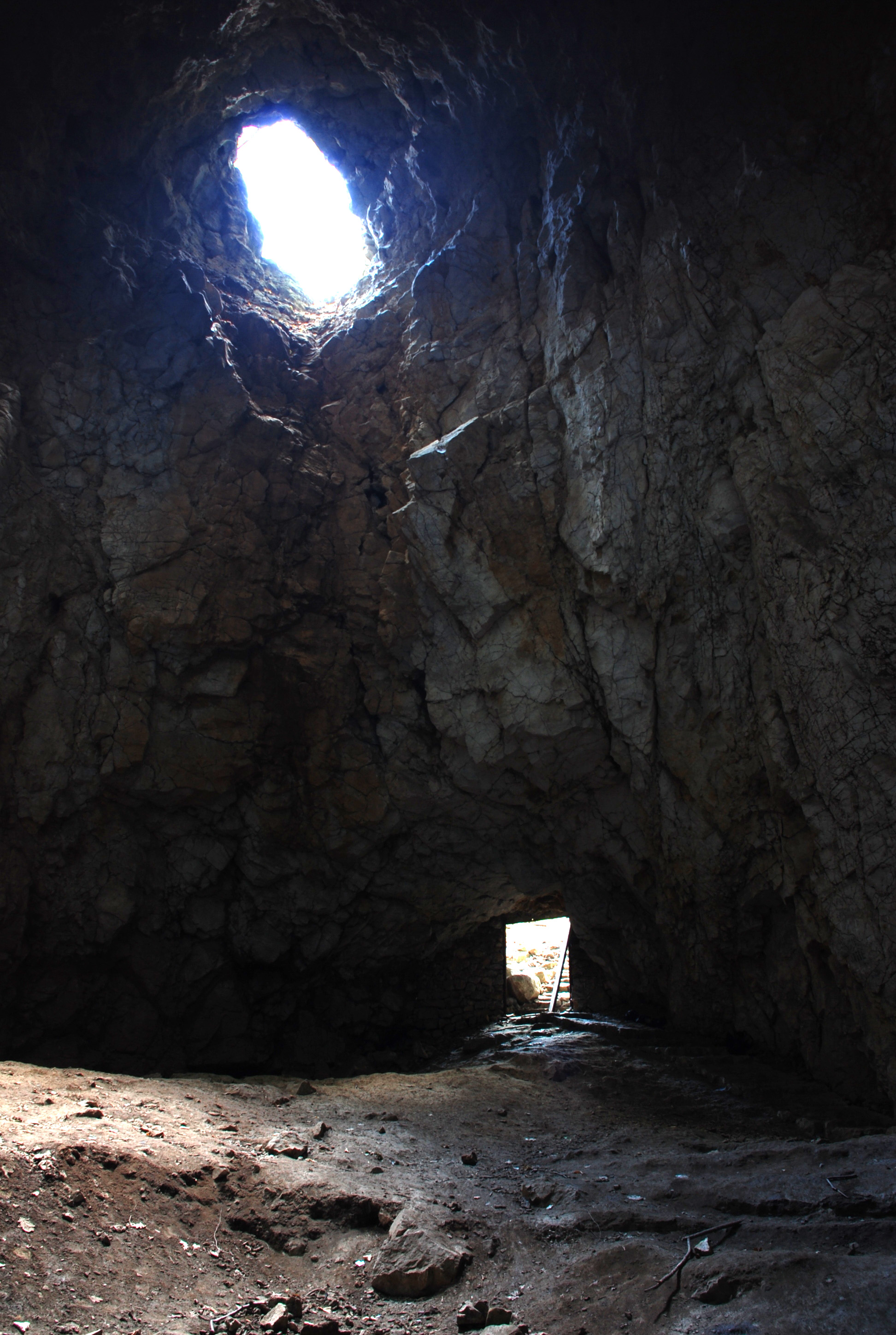
Petnica cave

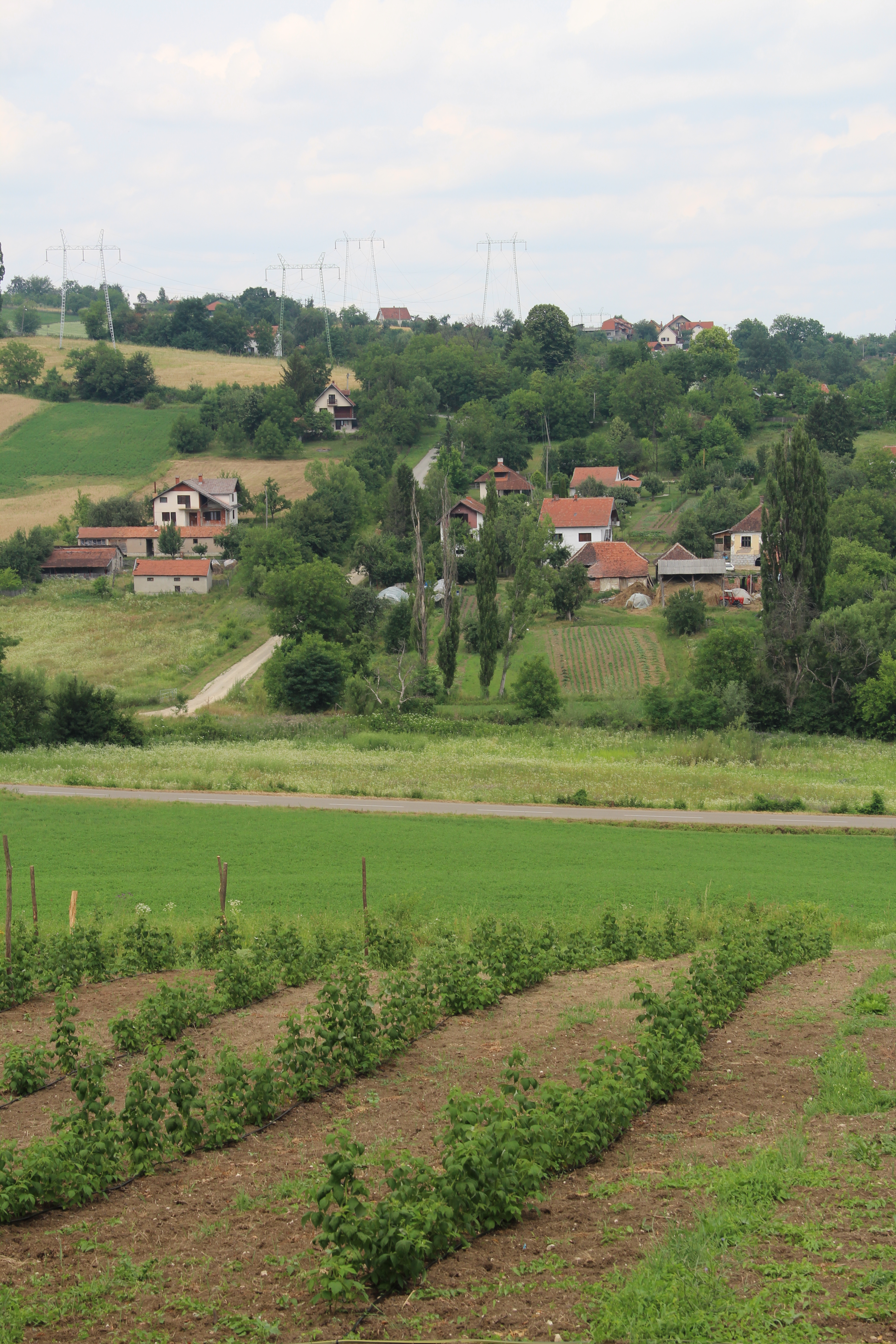
Petnica - panorama

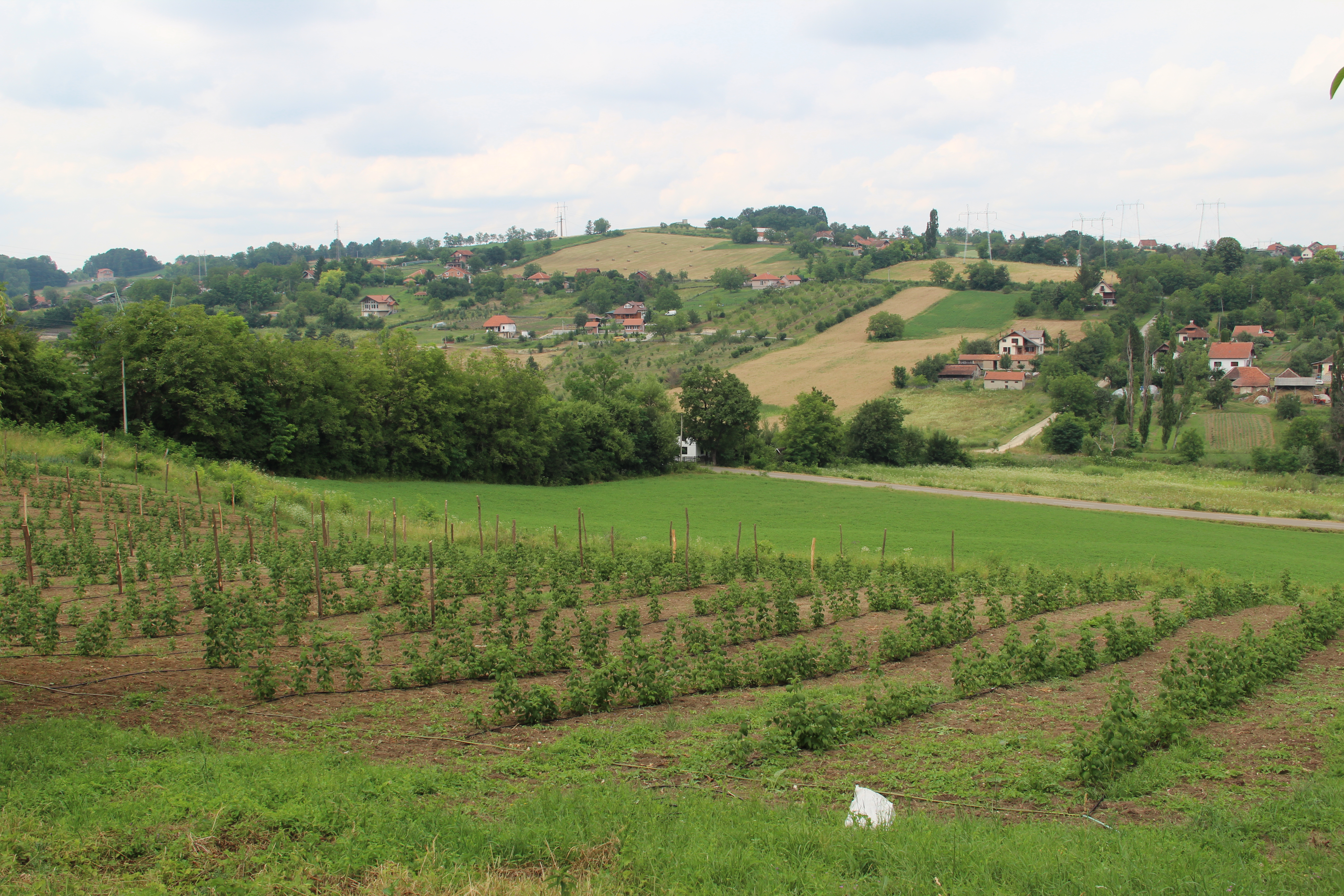
Petnica - panorama

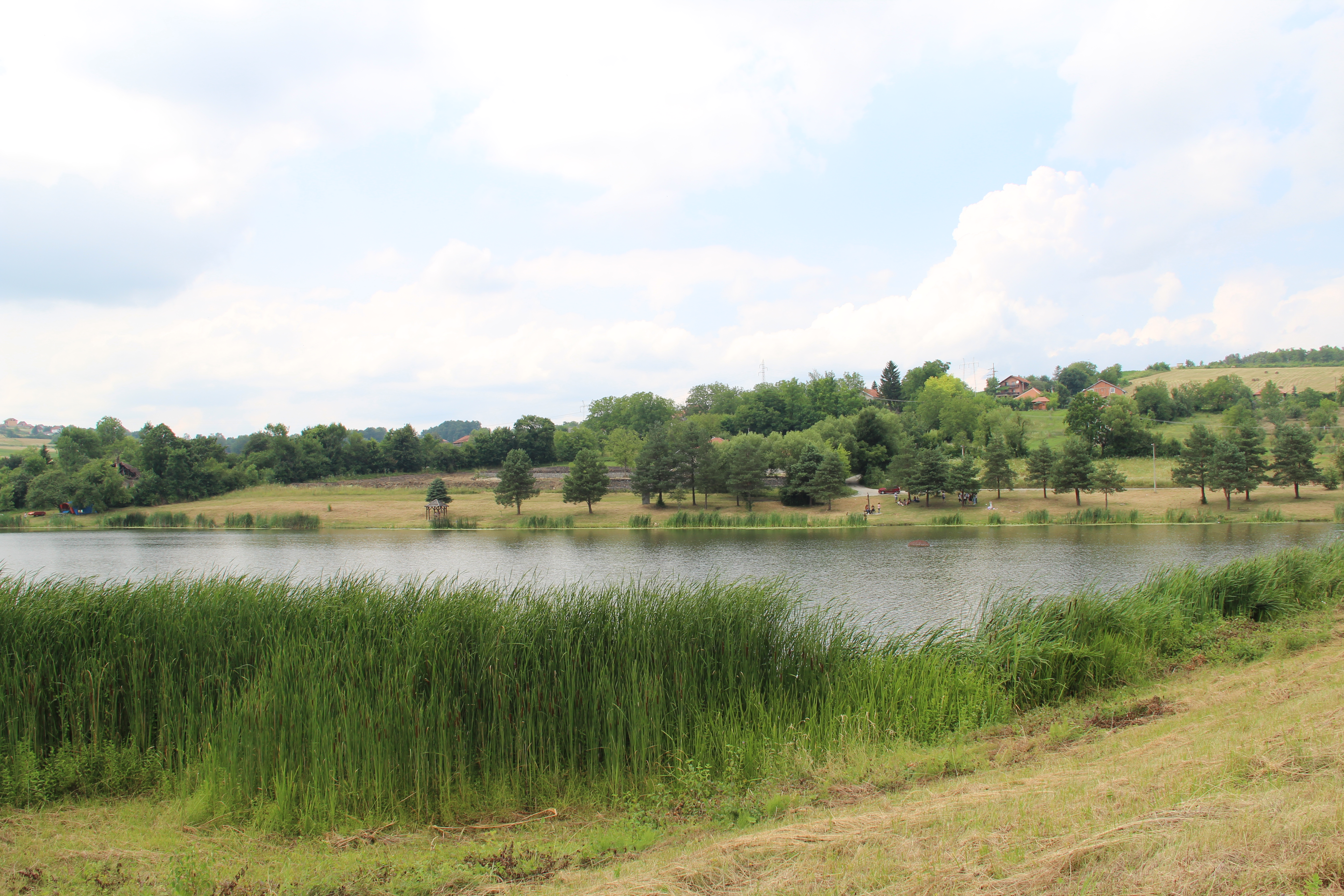
Petnica - panorama

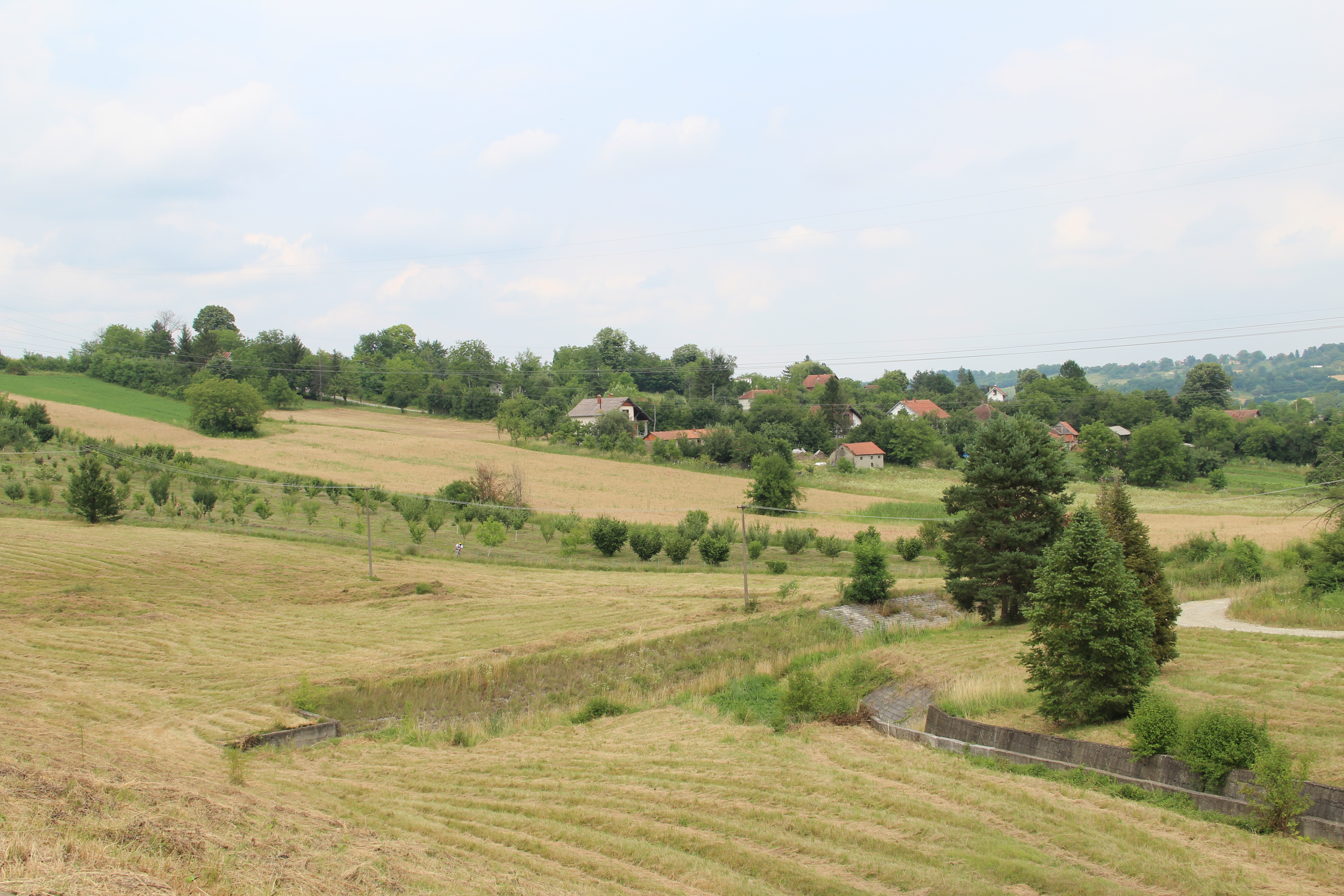
Petnica - panorama

== Notable people ==
- Ljubomir Kovačević (1848–1918), Serbian writer, historian and politician

== See also ==
- List of places in Serbia
