= Klinci =

Klinci Клинци (Serbian)
- Village (Selo)
- Klinci
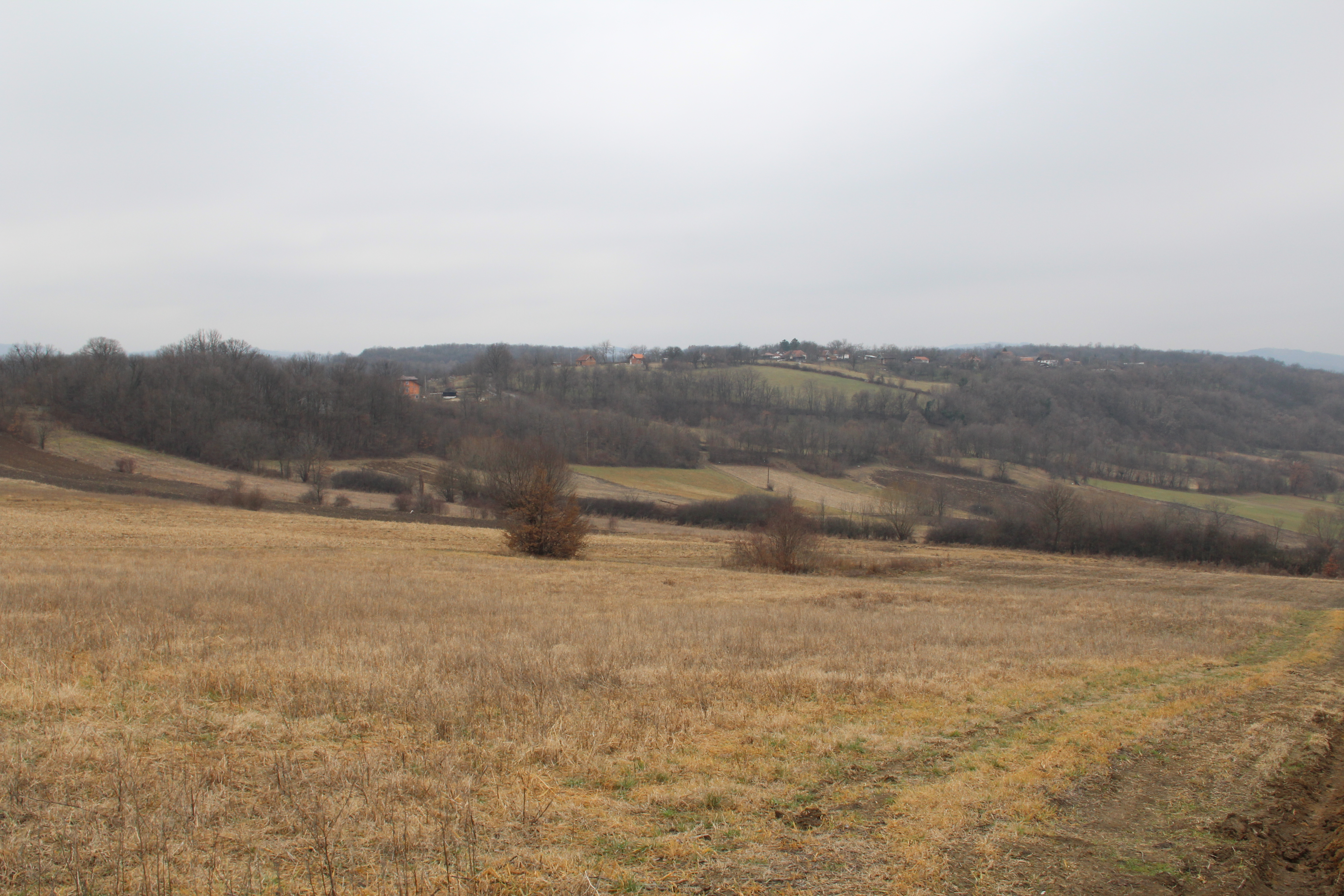
- Village of Klinci

- Location within Serbia Klinci (Europe)
- Coordinates: 44°15′N 19°57′E
- Country: Serbia
- District: Kolubara
- Municipalities: Valjevo
- Elevation: 258 m (846 ft)

Population (2022)
  - Klinci: 245
- Time zone: UTC+1 (CET)
  - Summer (DST): UTC+2 (CEST)
- Postal code: 14104
- Area code: +381(0)14
- Car plates: VA

Klinci (Serbian Cyrillic: Клинци, Serbian pronunciation: [kliːntsi]) is a village in the municipality of Valjevo, in the district of Kolubara, Serbia. According to the 2022 census, the village has a population of 245 people.

== Etymology ==
According to legend, Klinci is named after a nickname of one of its inhabitants. A man named Mitar (an ancestor of the Todorić and Vasiljević families) traveled across the Sava River to a fair in Srem to sell oxen. On his journey back home, he wore out his footwear and bought a pair of leather shoes (opanci) reinforced with small iron tacks (klinci). Because the shoes were poorly made, one of the tacks pierced his foot, leaving him wounded. After he returned home, the villagers named him Mitar Klinčanin, and eventually the settlement itself adopted the name Klinci.

== Geography ==
Klinci is located on the fifth kilometer of the Valjevo–Suvobor–Čačak road, Klinci borders the villages of Beloševac, Petnica, Žabari and Paune, occupying most of the ridge above Petnica Cave and extends to the north.

The distance between Klinci and the tourist center Divčibare is 29 km. Klinci is about 6 km from Valjevo and 23 km from Banja Vrujci.

== History ==
=== Origins ===
Before adopting its current name, the older settlement located in the central part of the modern village was known as Palanka. Evidence of early habitation includes ancient coins from the Ottoman era, pottery shards, structural remains, dry-stone boundaries, and tools uncovered while plowing.

== Geology ==
Geologically, the area's marly lake deposits preserve fossils from the Miocene epoch, including freshwater goby fish skeletons from the ancient Valjevo lake in the Valjevo-Mionica Basin.

== Transport ==
An asphalt road connecting the village was built in 1979. The village has no railway station but there is a bus station in the village and several departures of public transport during the day.

== Agriculture ==
The main agricultural sectors are livestock breeding, fruit growing, and crop farming. The livestock of Klinci consists primarily of cattle (mainly domestic spotted Simmental, alongside smaller numbers of Holstein and crossbreeds), pigs (predominantly Landrace, Pietrain, and their crossbreeds), and sheep (mostly the Sjenica strain with smaller numbers of Württemberg). The primary crops grown are corn, barley, and wheat, along with smaller quantities of oats.

== Infrastructure ==
The village has no sewage system. The water supply system was built in 1998; since then, the residents have had unlimited access to clean drinking water. Klinci gained electricity in 1949, and streetlights were installed across the village in the summer of 2010. Most of the houses have telephone and internet connections.

== Demographics ==
According to the 2022 census, Klinci had 245 inhabitants (114 male and 131 female).

=== Historical population ===
The village population has been fluctuating in numbers for decades but has remained relatively stable between 220 and 270 residents.

Historical population
| Year | Pop. | ±% |
|---|---|---|
| 1948 | 262 | — |
| 1953 | 238 | −9.2% |
| 1961 | 251 | +5.5% |
| 1971 | 244 | −2.8% |
| 1981 | 236 | −3.3% |
| 1991 | 220 | −6.8% |
| 2002 | 269 | +22.3% |
| 2011 | 233 | −13.4% |
| 2022 | 245 | +5.2% |
Source: Statistical Office of the Republic of Serbia

== Gallery ==
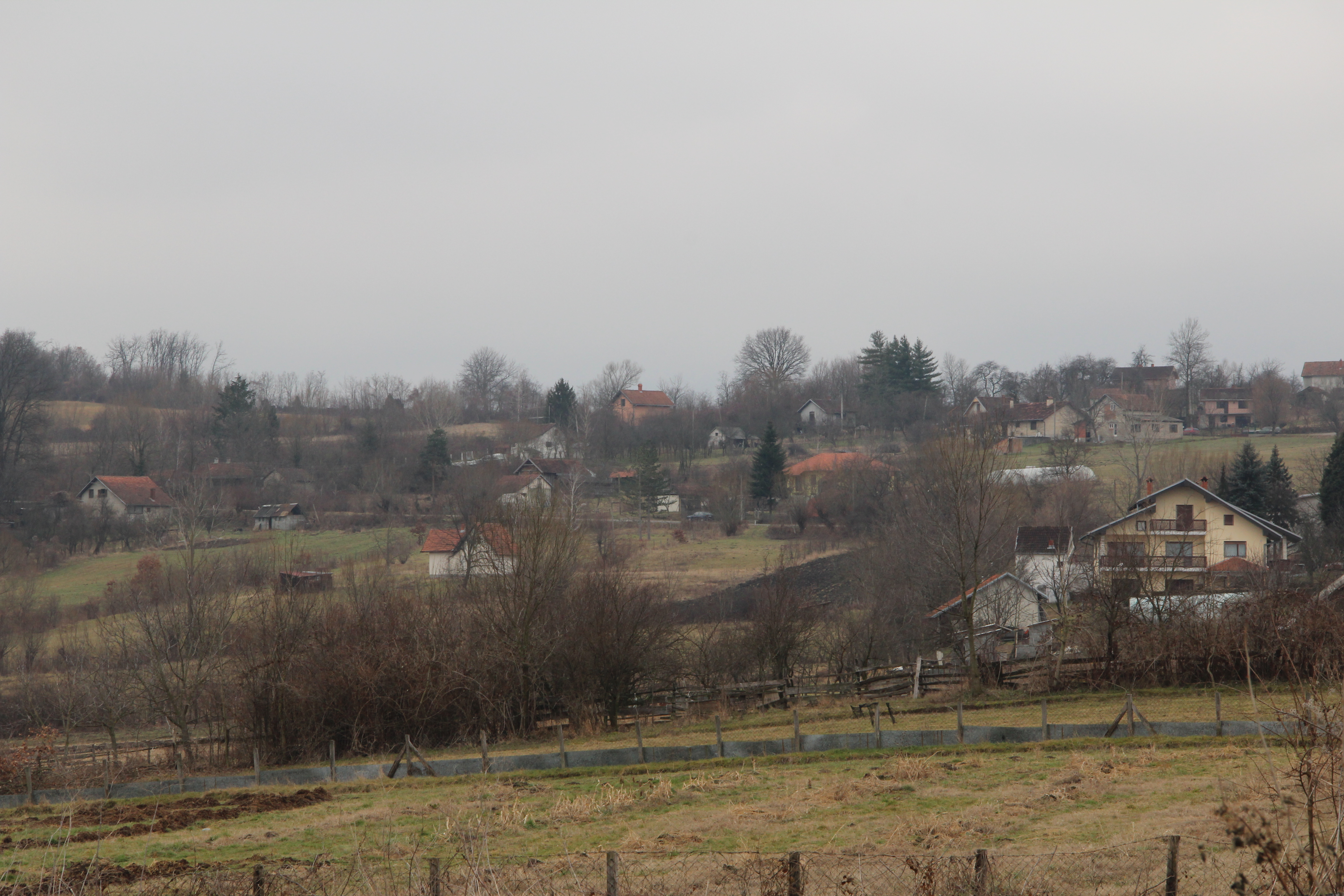
Village of Klinci – Panorama looking east

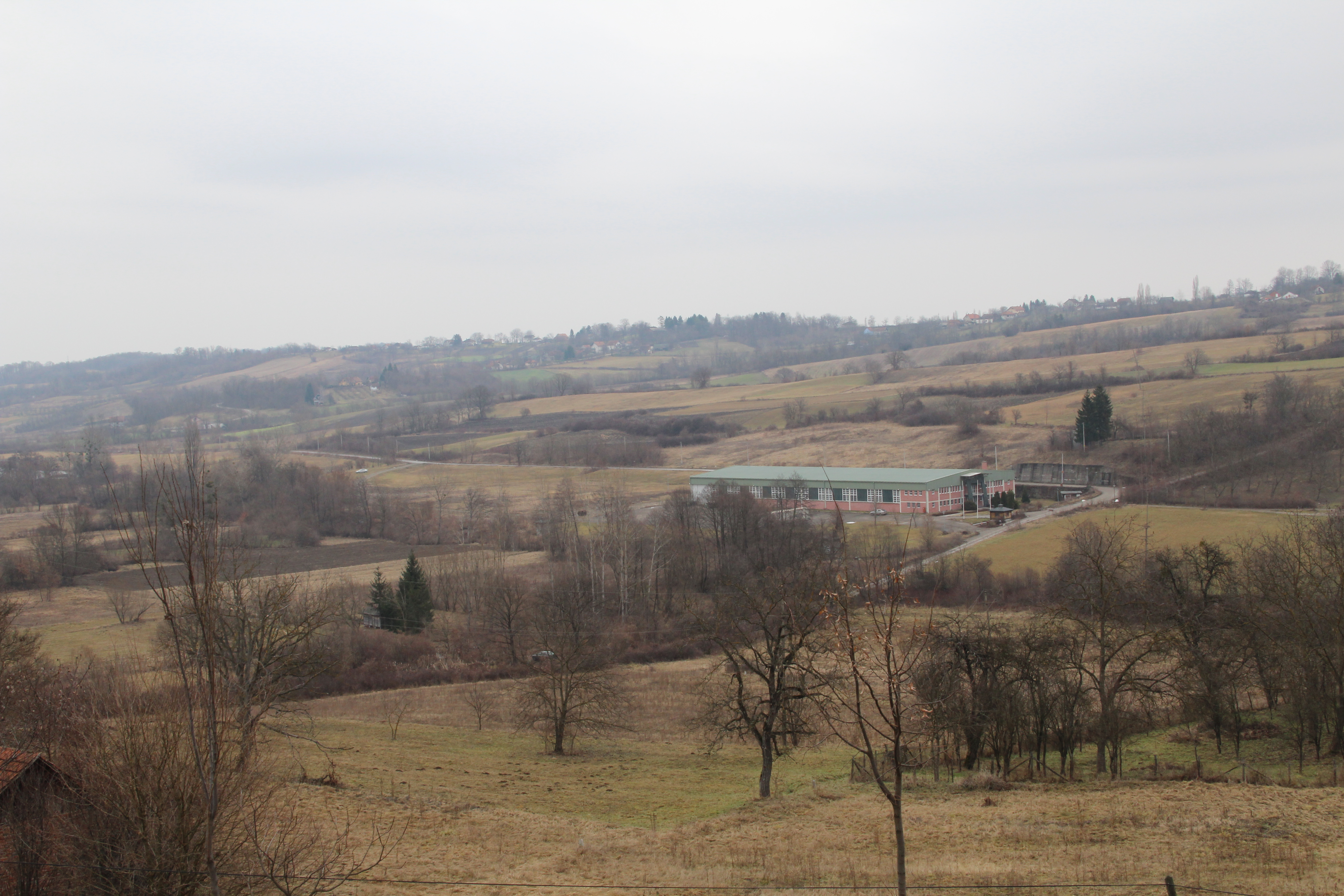
Village of Klinci – water factory

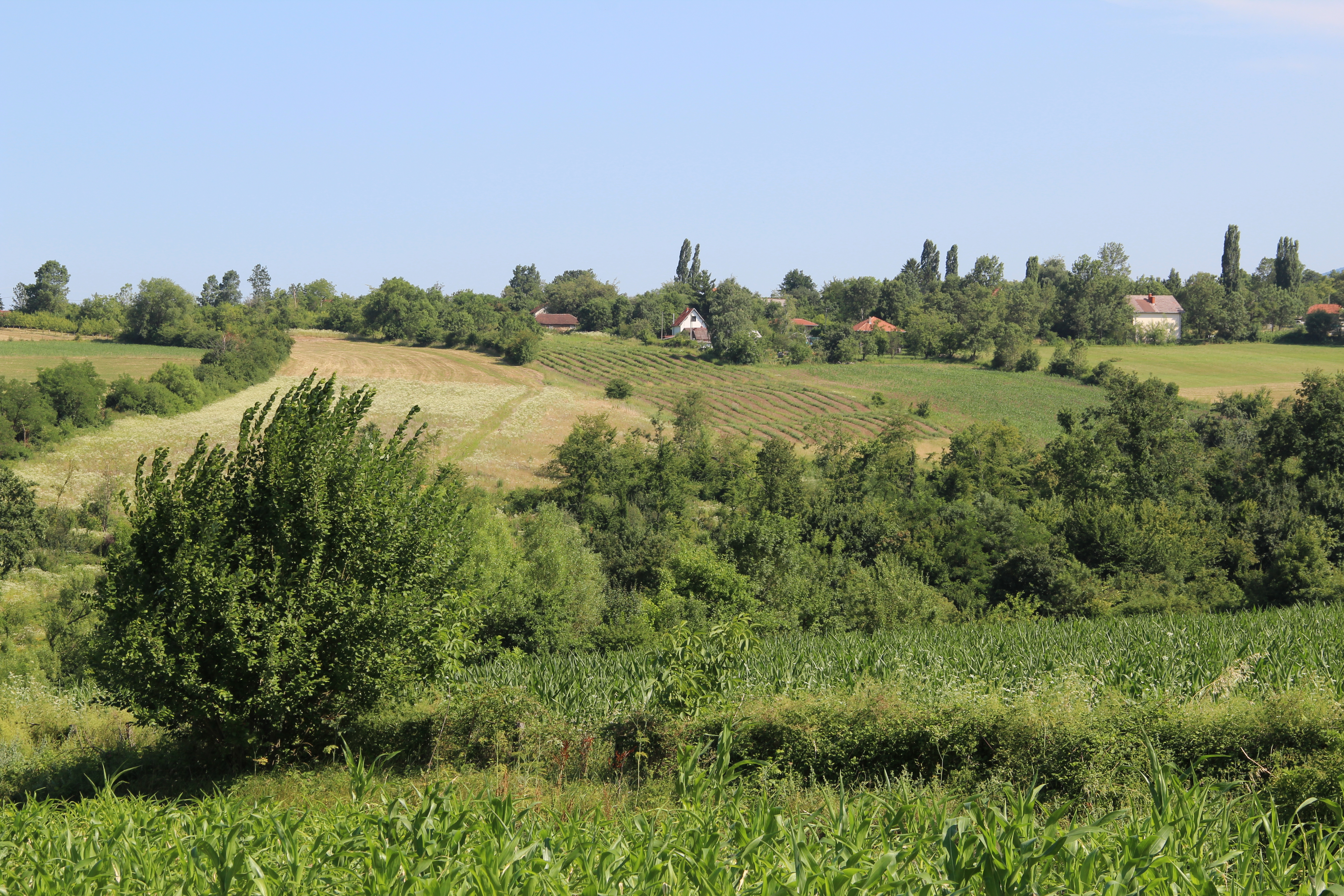
Village of Klinci – panorama

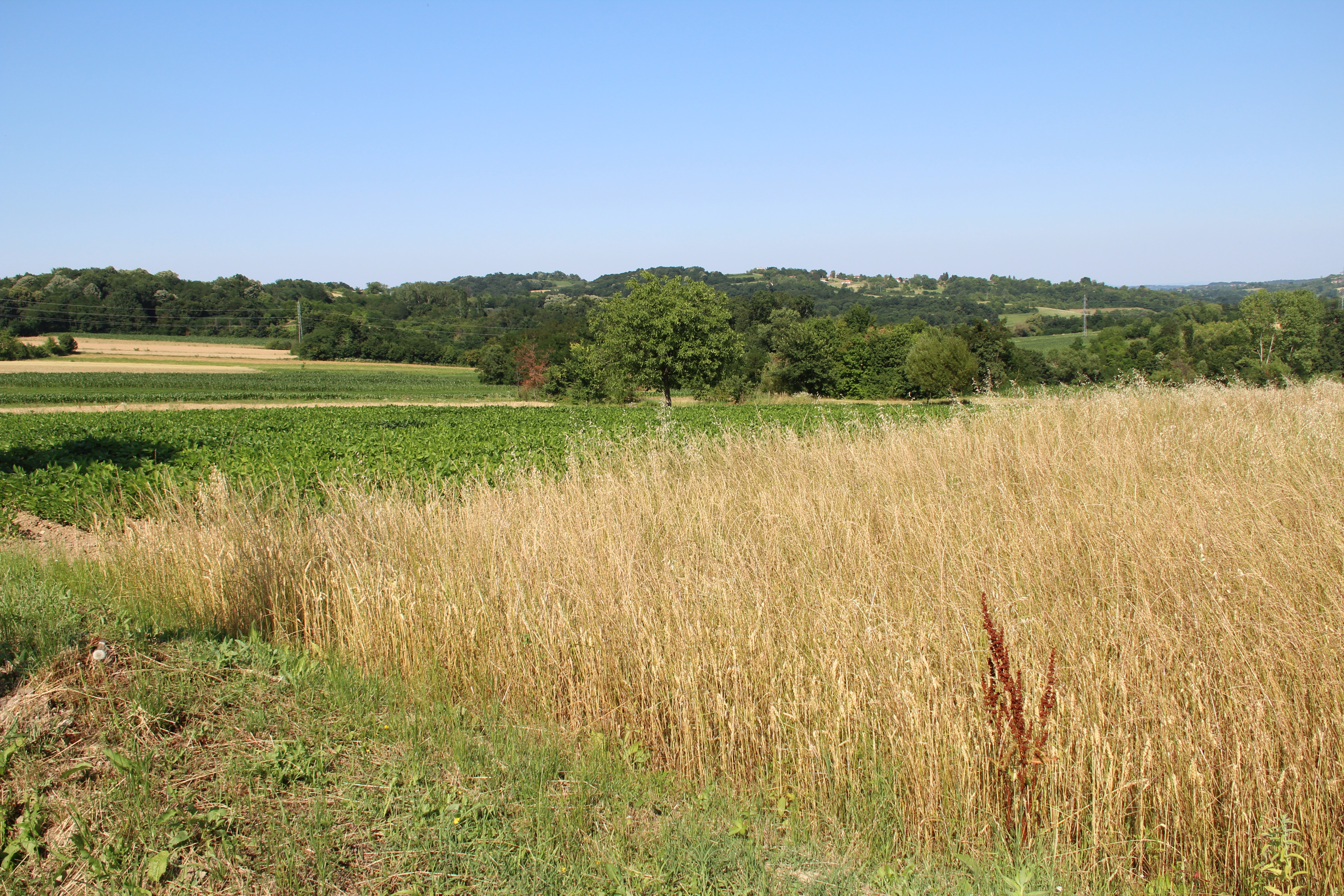
Village of Klinci – panorama

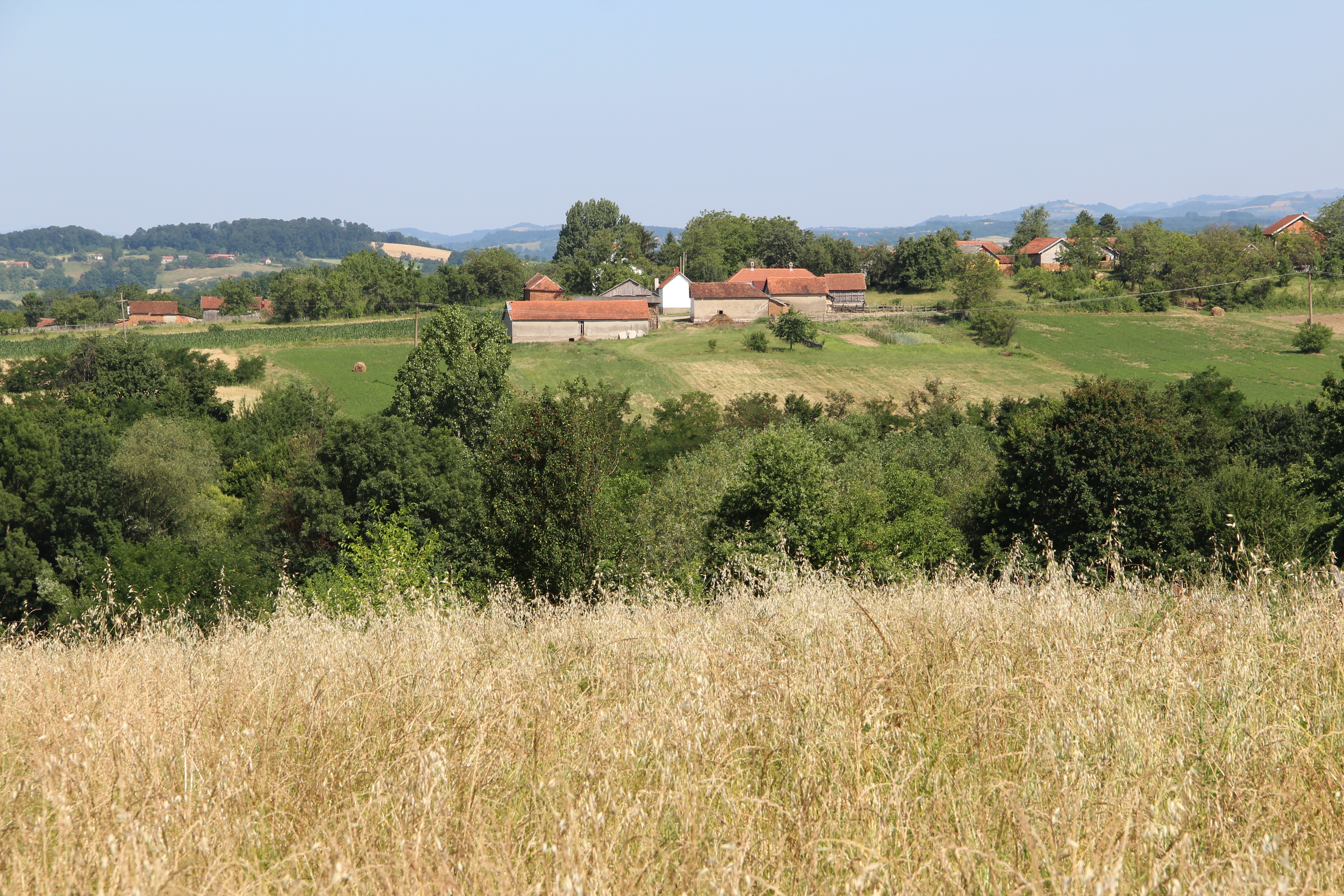
Village of Klinci – panorama

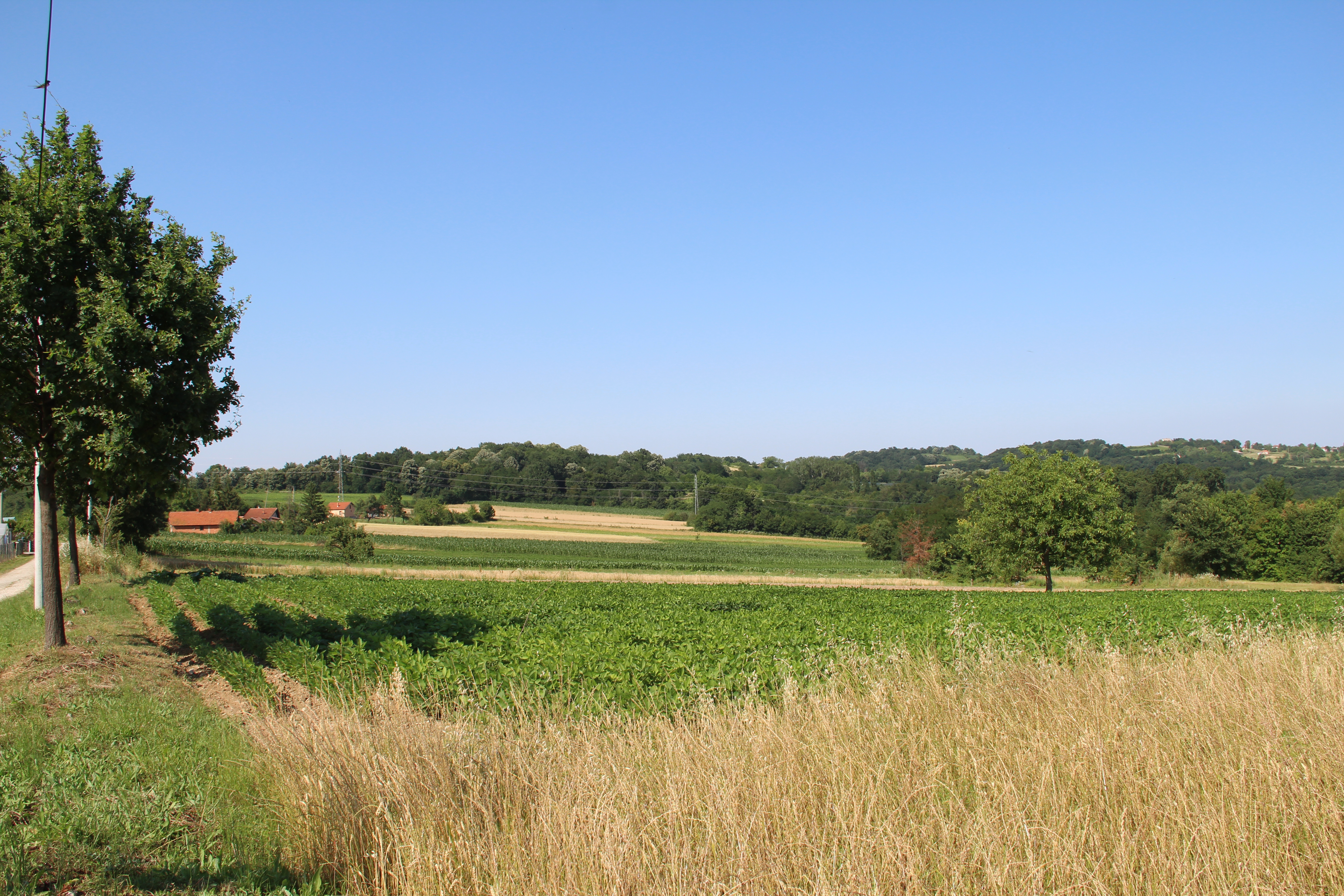
Village of Klinci – panorama

== See also ==
- List of populated places in Serbia
