= Paune =

Paune Пауне (Serbian)
- Village (Selo)
- Paune
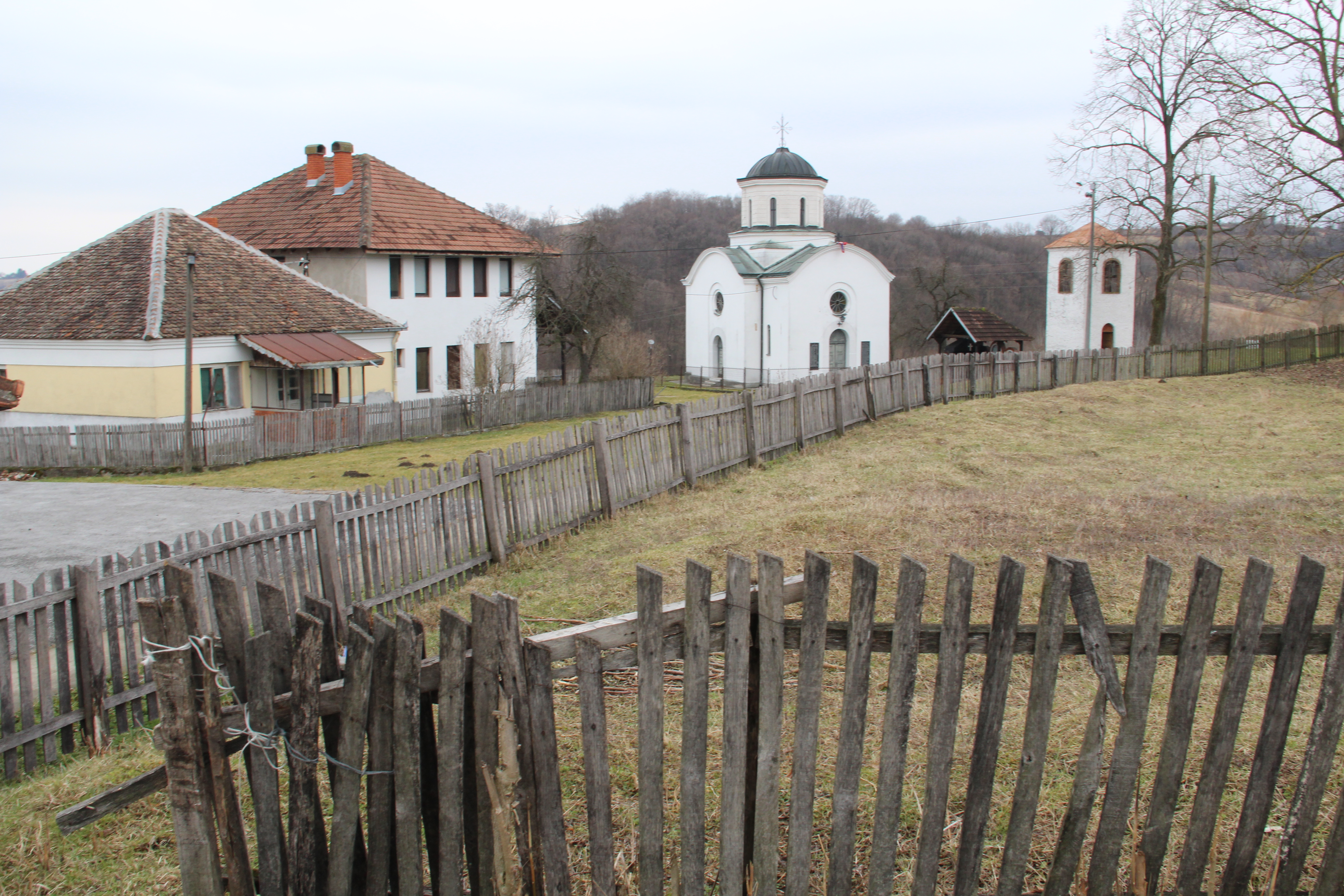
- Church of the Birth of St. John the Baptist

- Location within Serbia Paune (Europe)
- Coordinates: 44°14′N 19°57′E
- Country: Serbia
- District: Kolubara
- Municipalities: Valjevo
- Elevation: 281 m (922 ft)

Population (2022)
  - Paune: 403
- Time zone: UTC+1 (CET)
  - Summer (DST): UTC+2 (CEST)
- Postal code: 14202
- Area code: +381(0)14
- Car plates: VA

Paune (Serbian Cyrillic: Пауне, Serbian pronunciation: [pa.u.ne]) is a village in the municipality of Valjevo in the Kolubara District, Serbia. According to the 2022 census, the village has a population of 403 people.

== Gallery ==
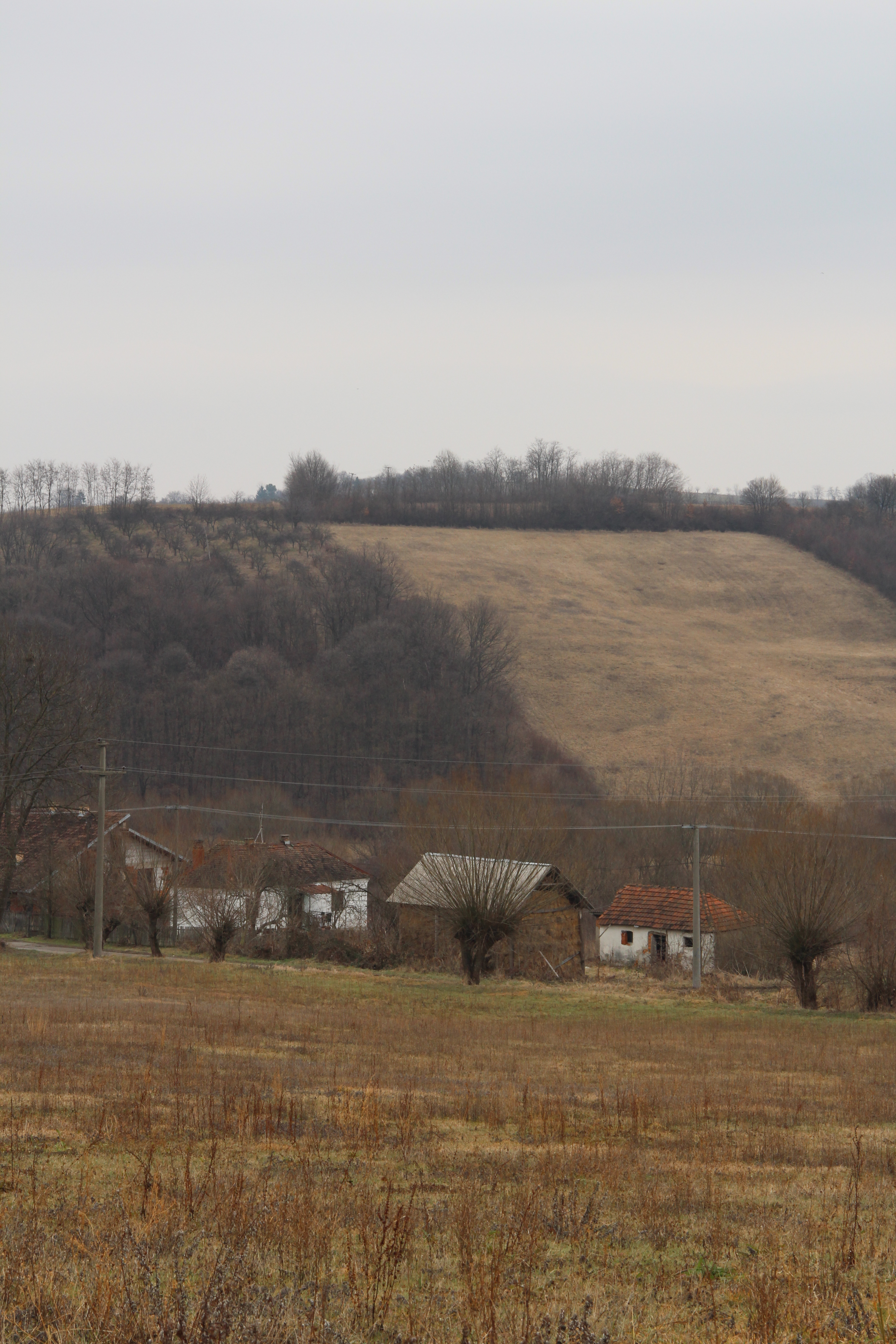
Village of Paune – panorama

== See also ==
- List of populated places in Serbia
