= Beloševac =

Beloševac Белошевац (Serbian)
- Village (Selo)
- Location within Serbia
- Coordinates: 44°15′N 19°56′E
- Country: Serbia
- District: Kolubara District
- Municipality: Valjevo

Population (2002)
  - Total: 849
- Time zone: UTC+1 (CET)
  - Summer (DST): UTC+2 (CEST)

Beloševac is a village in the municipality of Valjevo, Serbia. According to the 2002 census, the village has a population of 849 people.

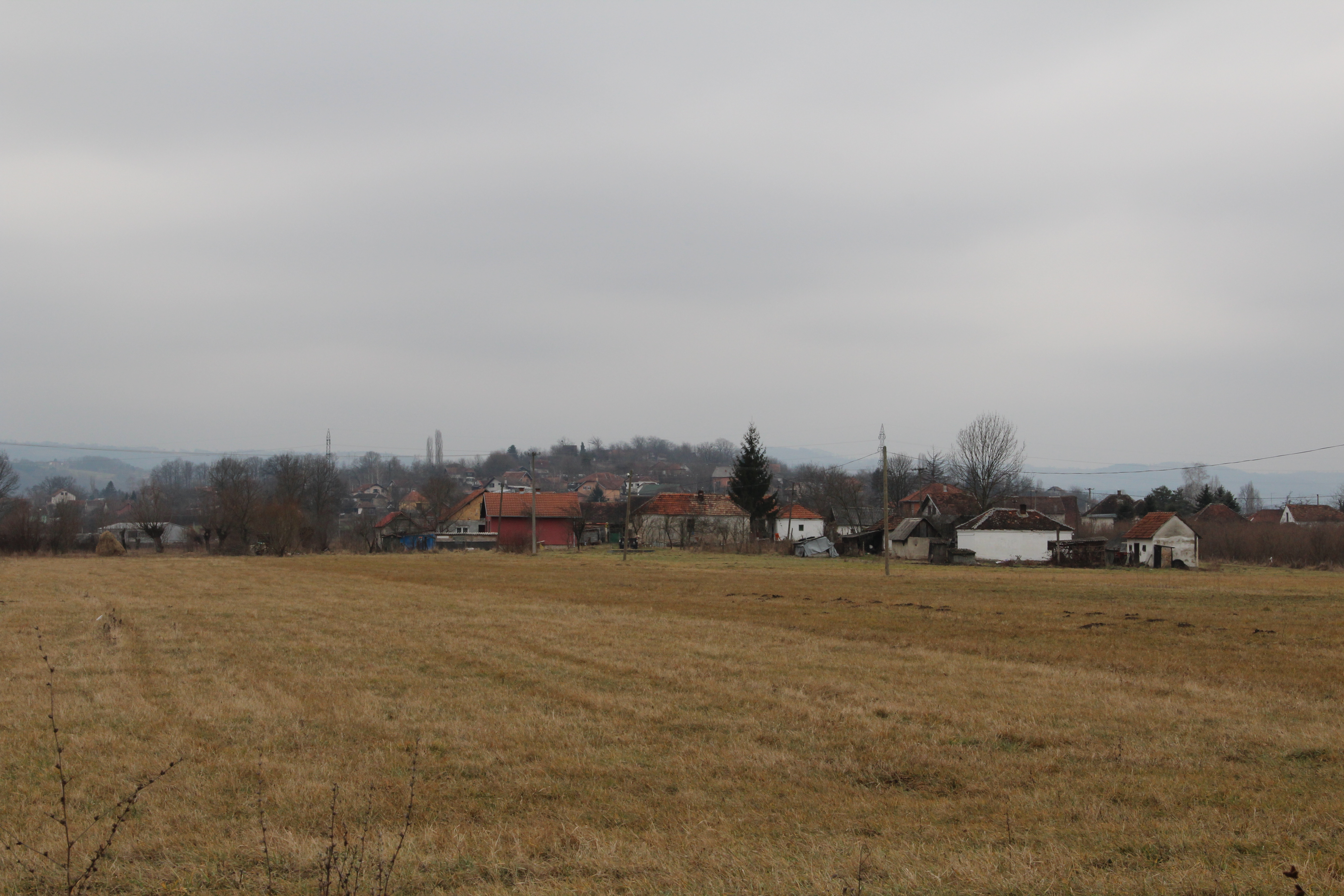
Belosevac village - panorama

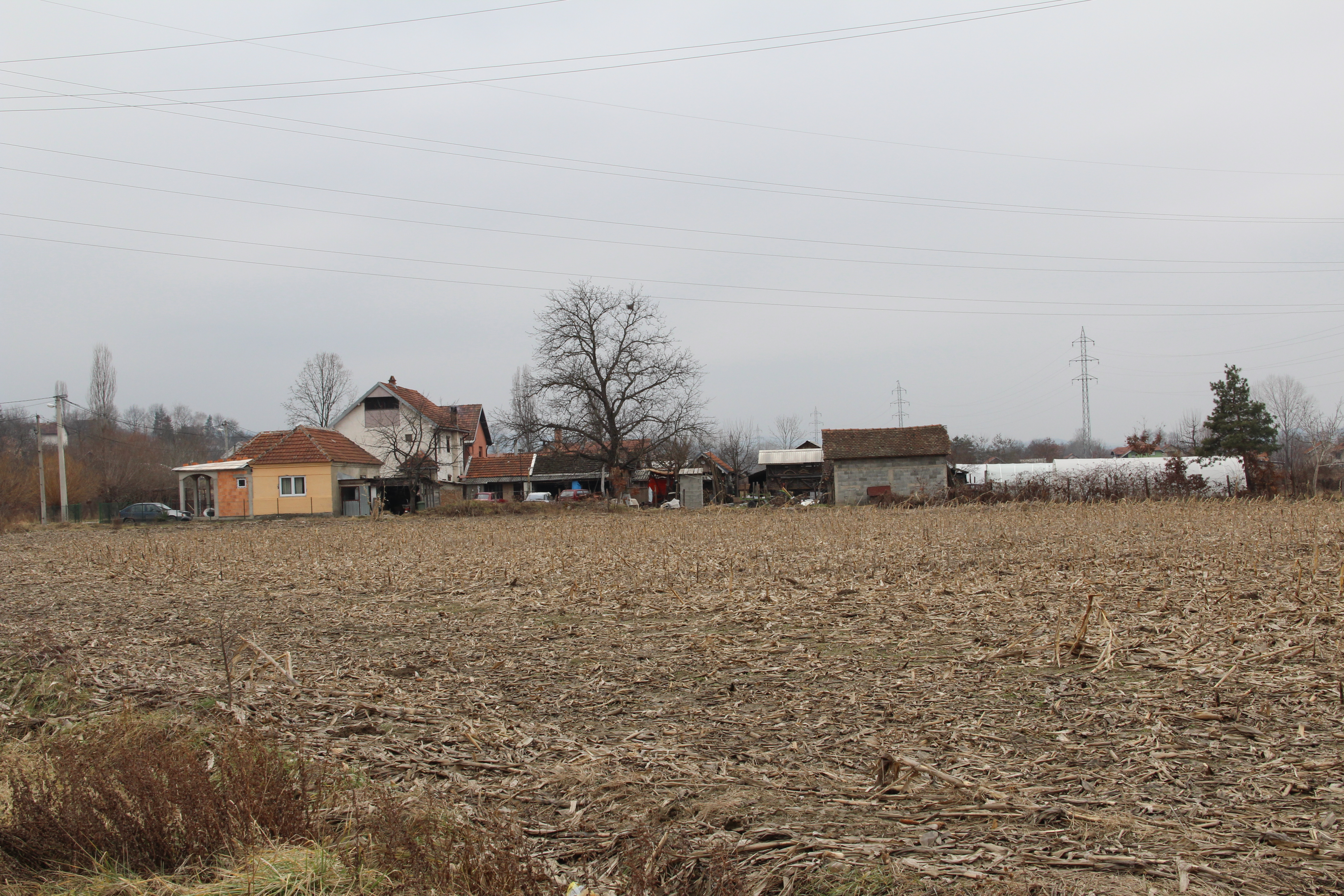
Belosevac village - panorama

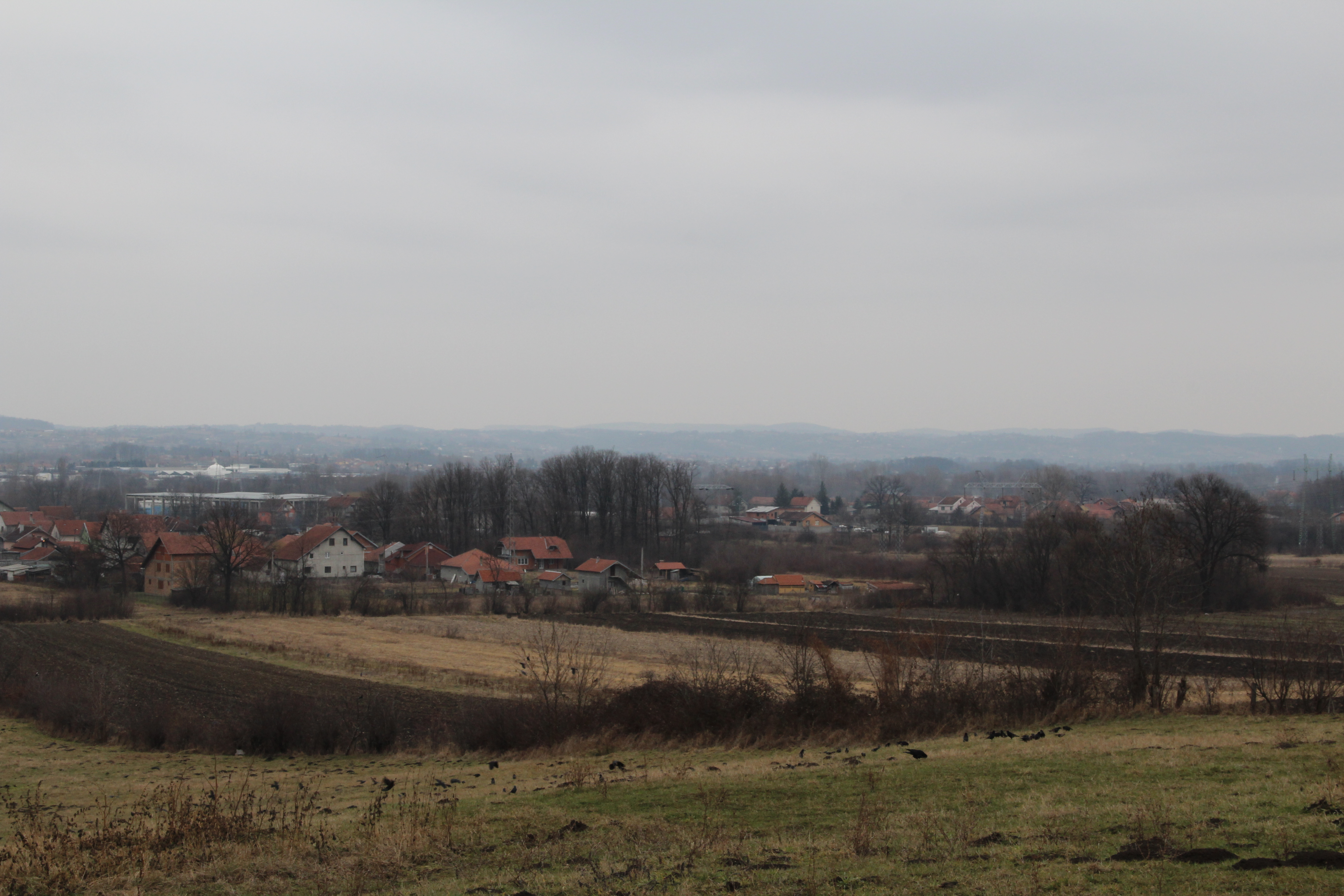
Belosevac village - view of the valley of the Kolubara

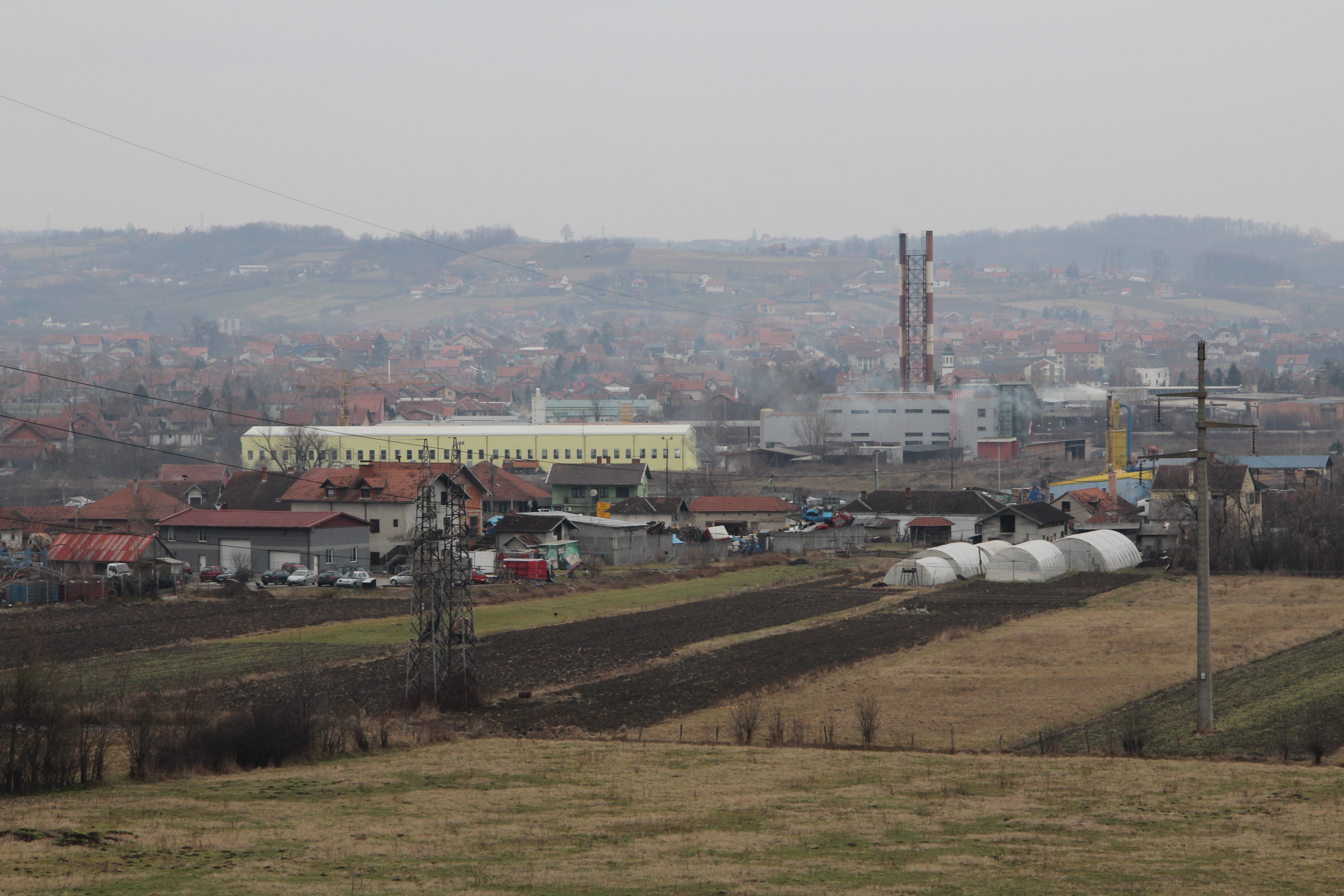
Belosevac village - view of the city heating plant in Valjevo

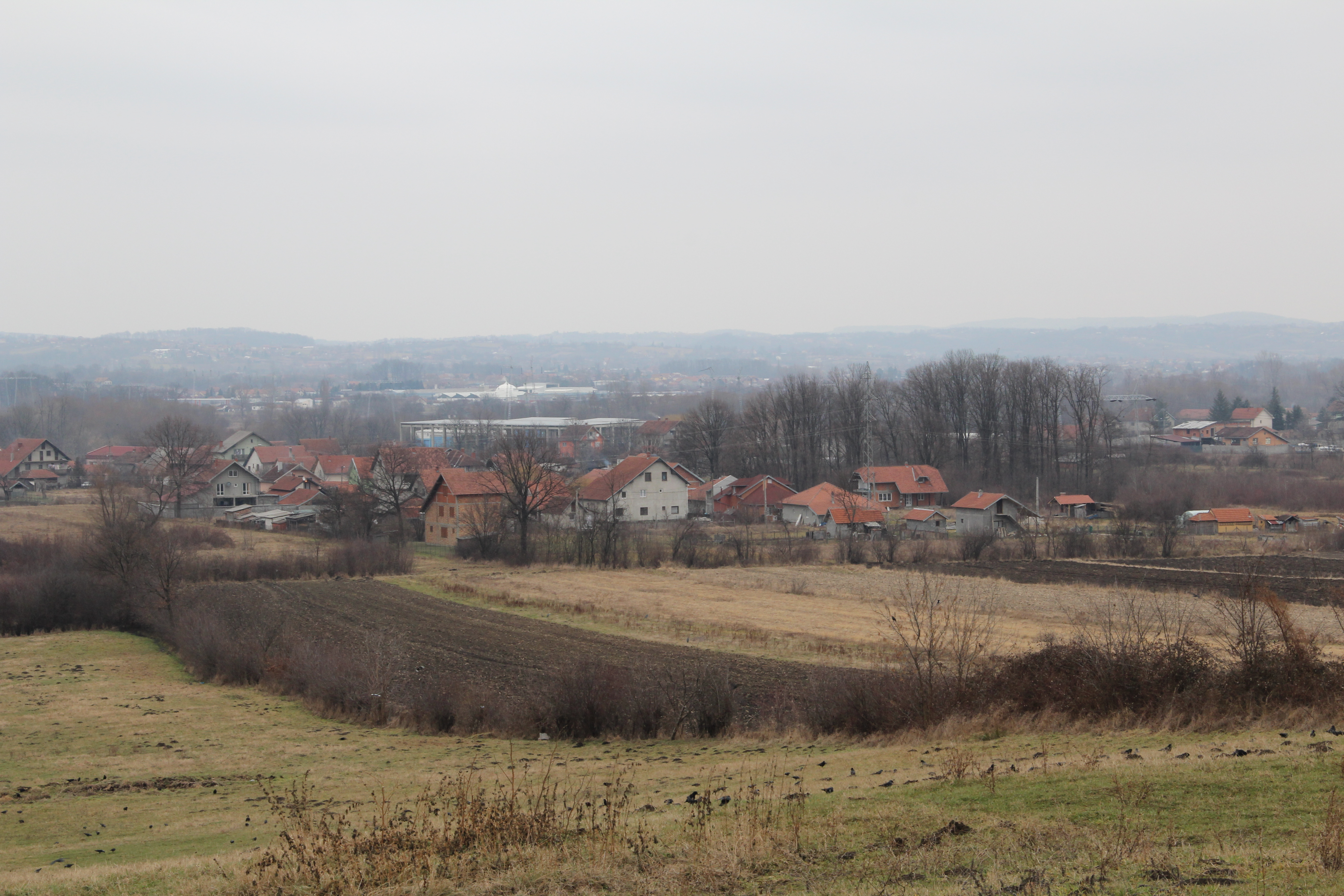
Belosevac village - view of the industrial zone of the city of Valjevo

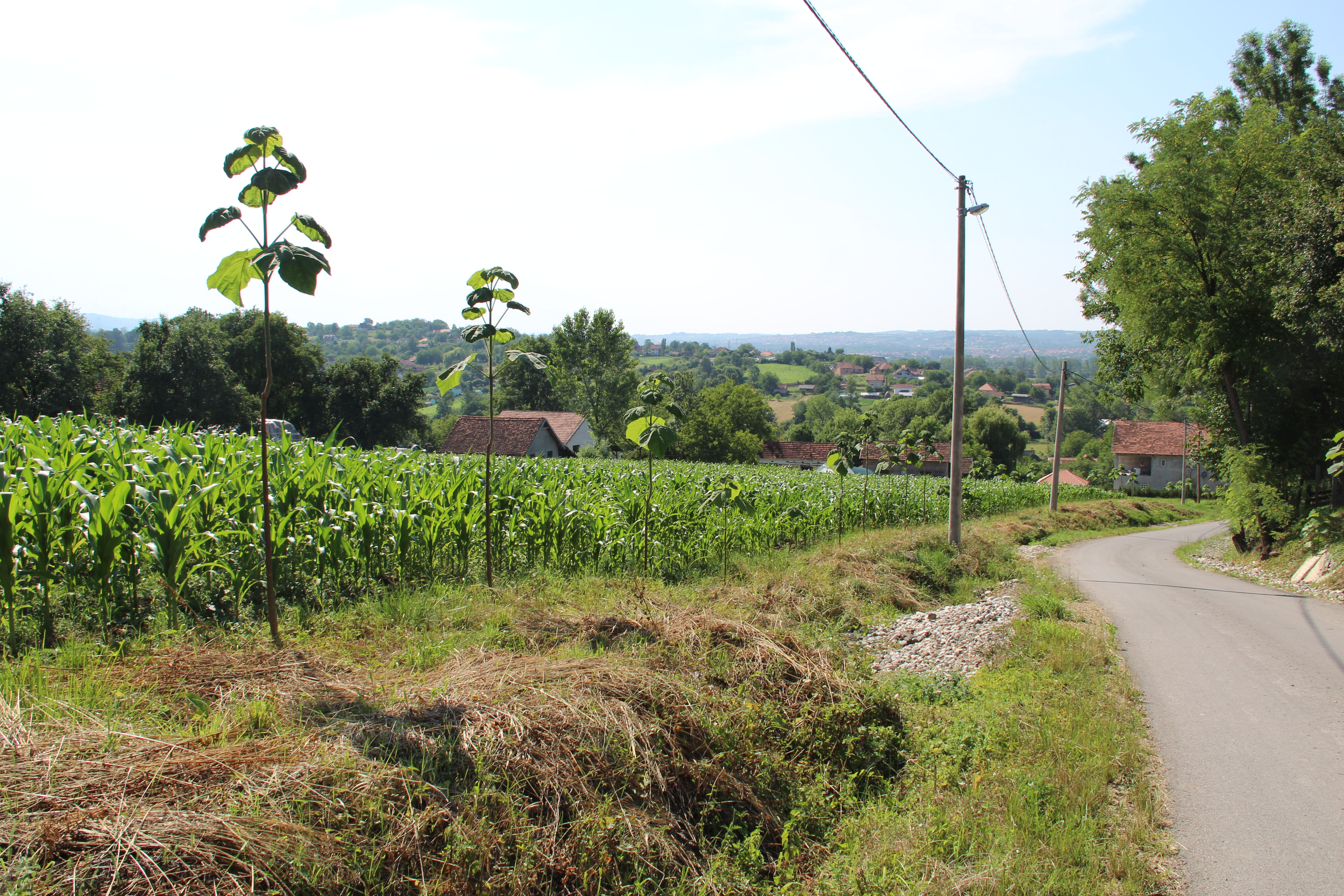
Belosevac - panorama

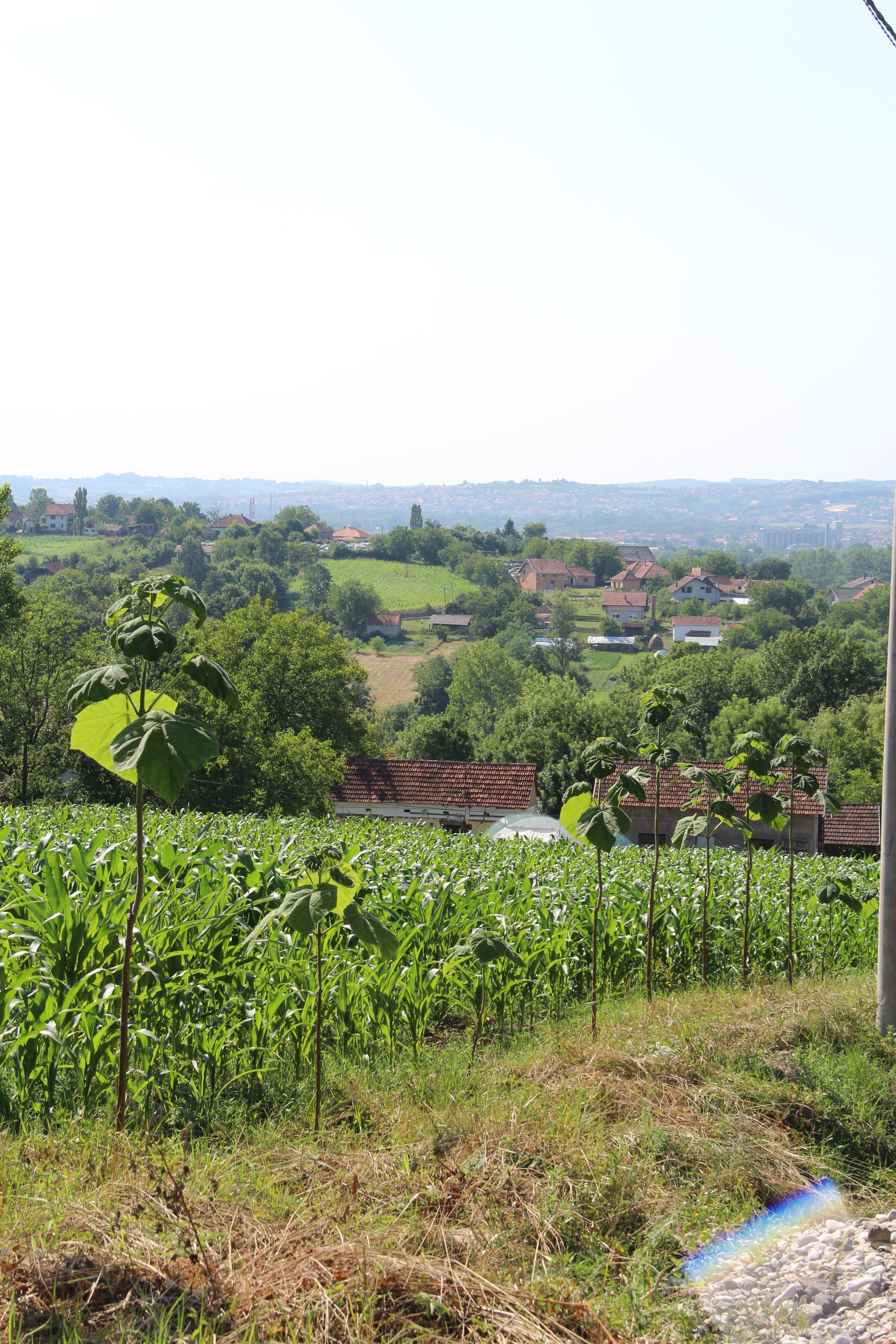
Belosevac - panorama

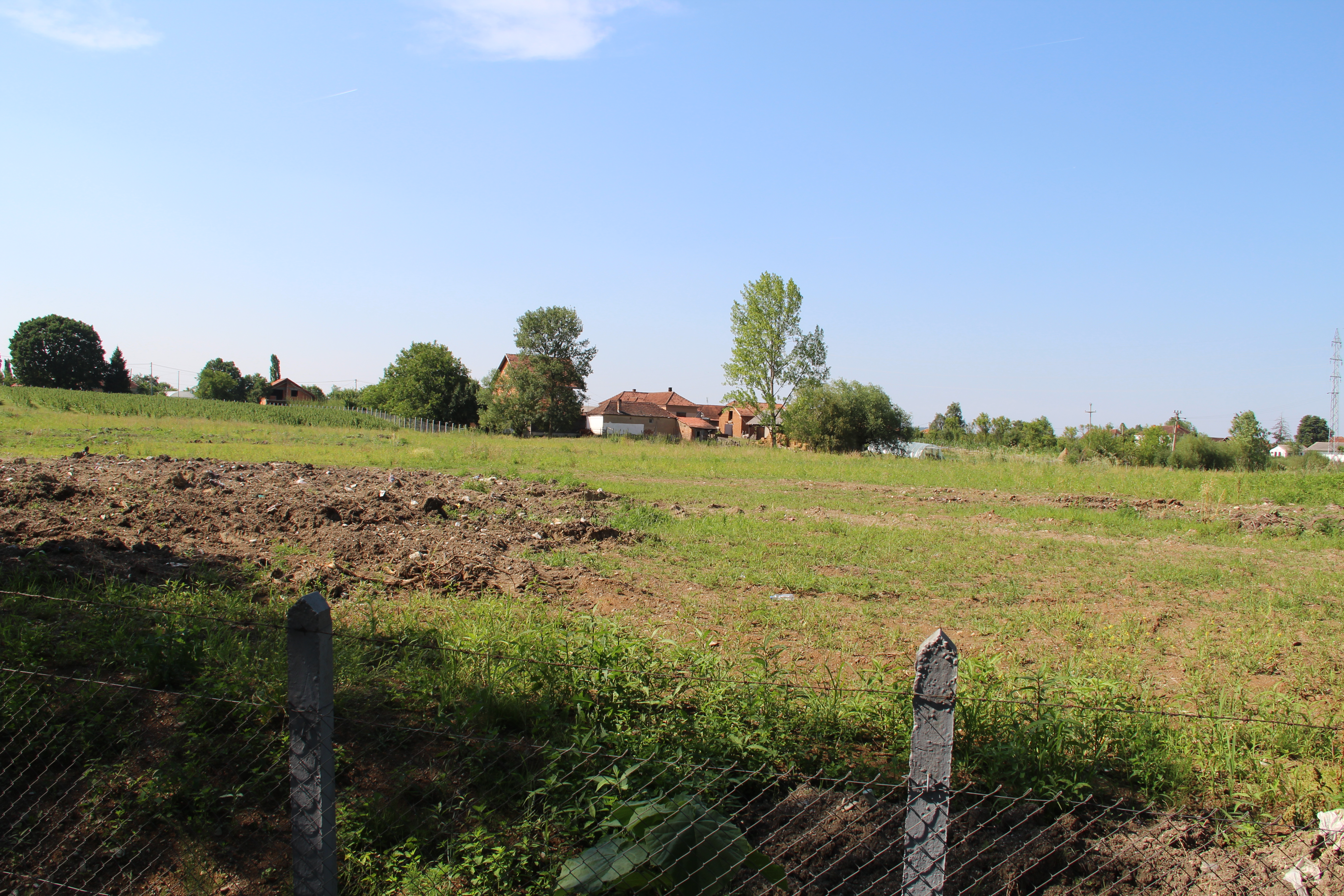
Belosevac - panorama

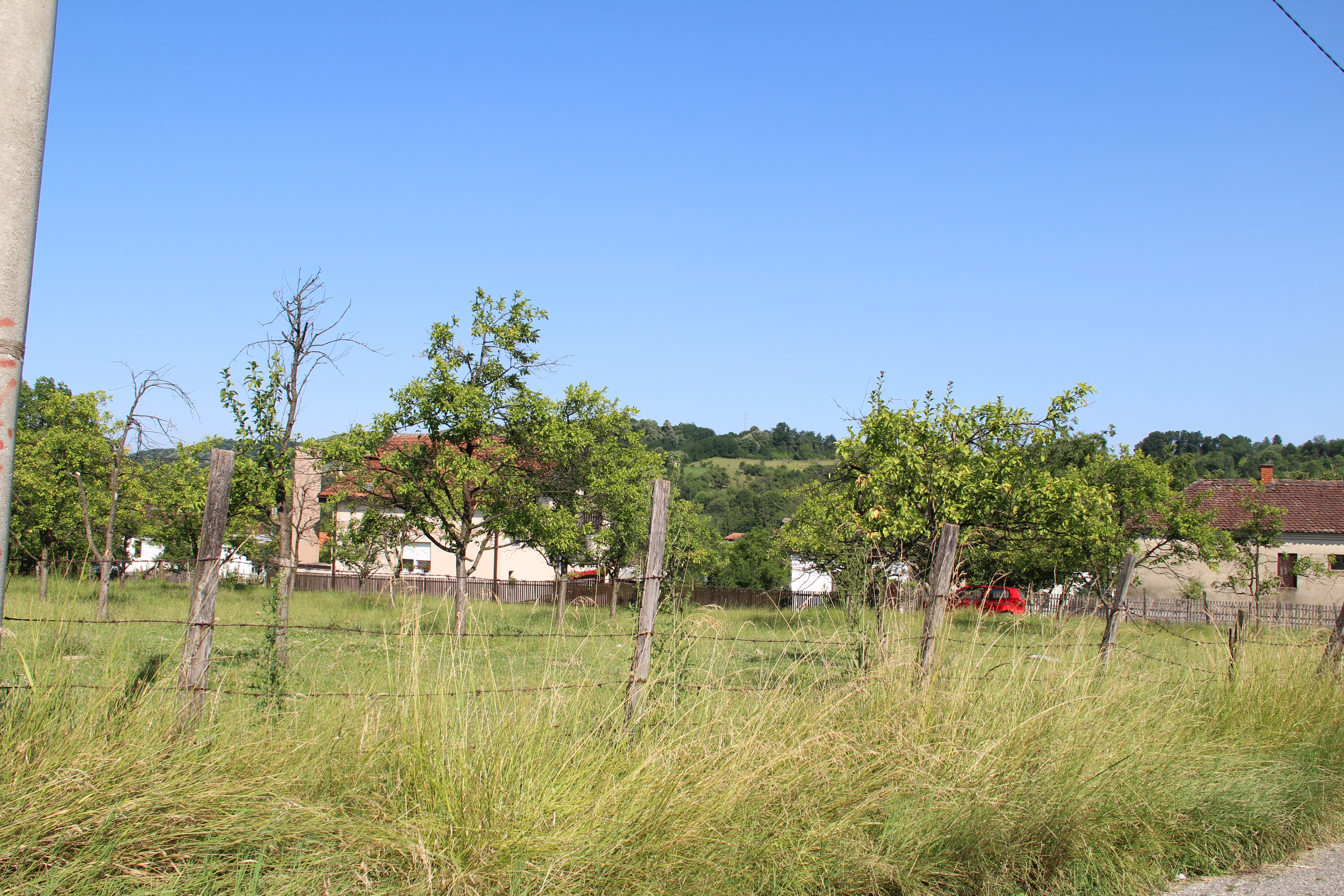
Belosevac - panorama
