= Žabari (Valjevo) =

Žabari Жабари
- Village
- Location within Serbia
- Coordinates: 44°13′N 19°56′E
- Country: Serbia
- District: Kolubara District
- Municipality: Valjevo

Population (2002)
  - Total: 452
- Time zone: UTC+1 (CET)
  - Summer (DST): UTC+2 (CEST)

Žabari is a village in the municipality of Valjevo, Serbia. According to the 2002 census, the village has a population of 452 people.

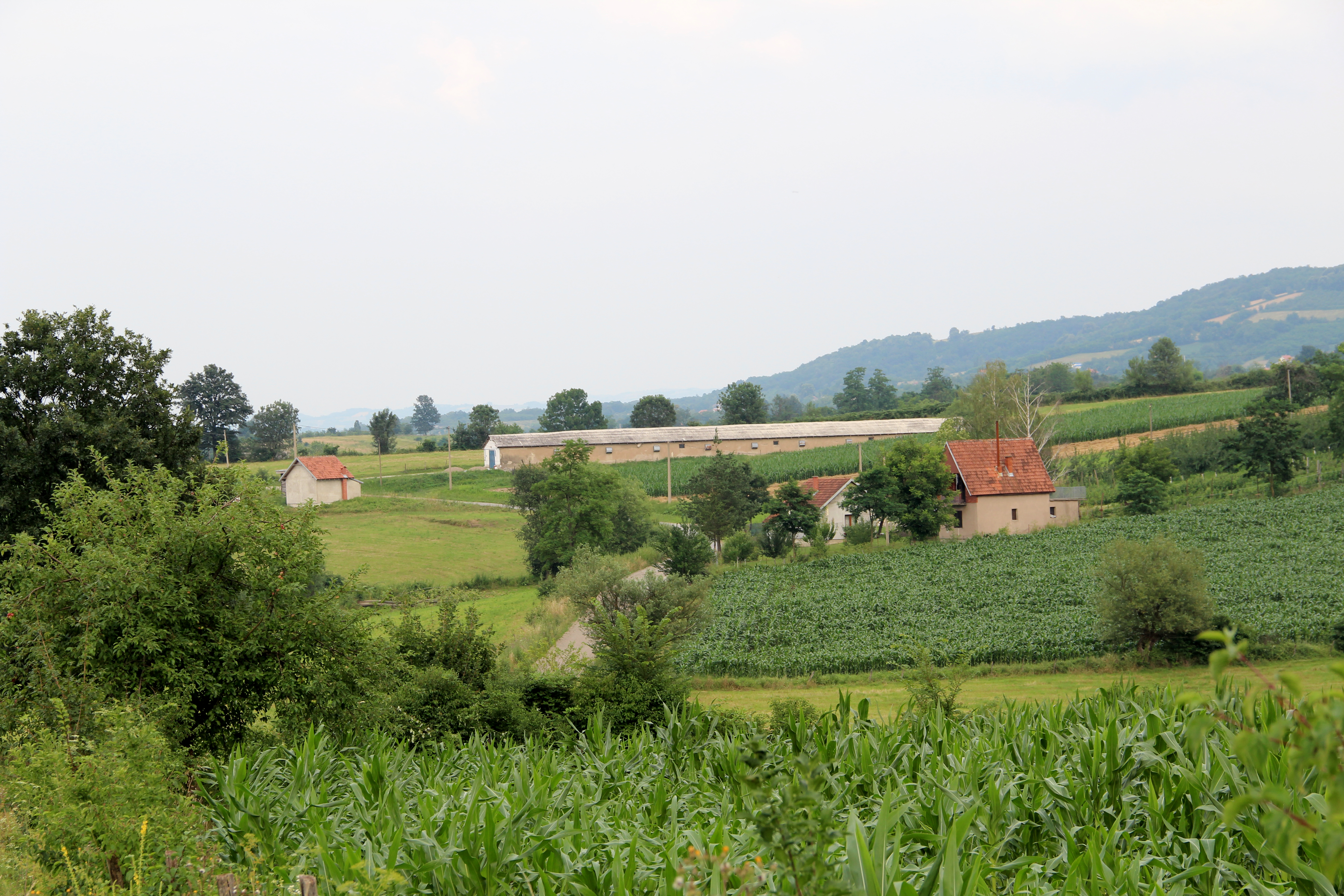
Žabari - panorama

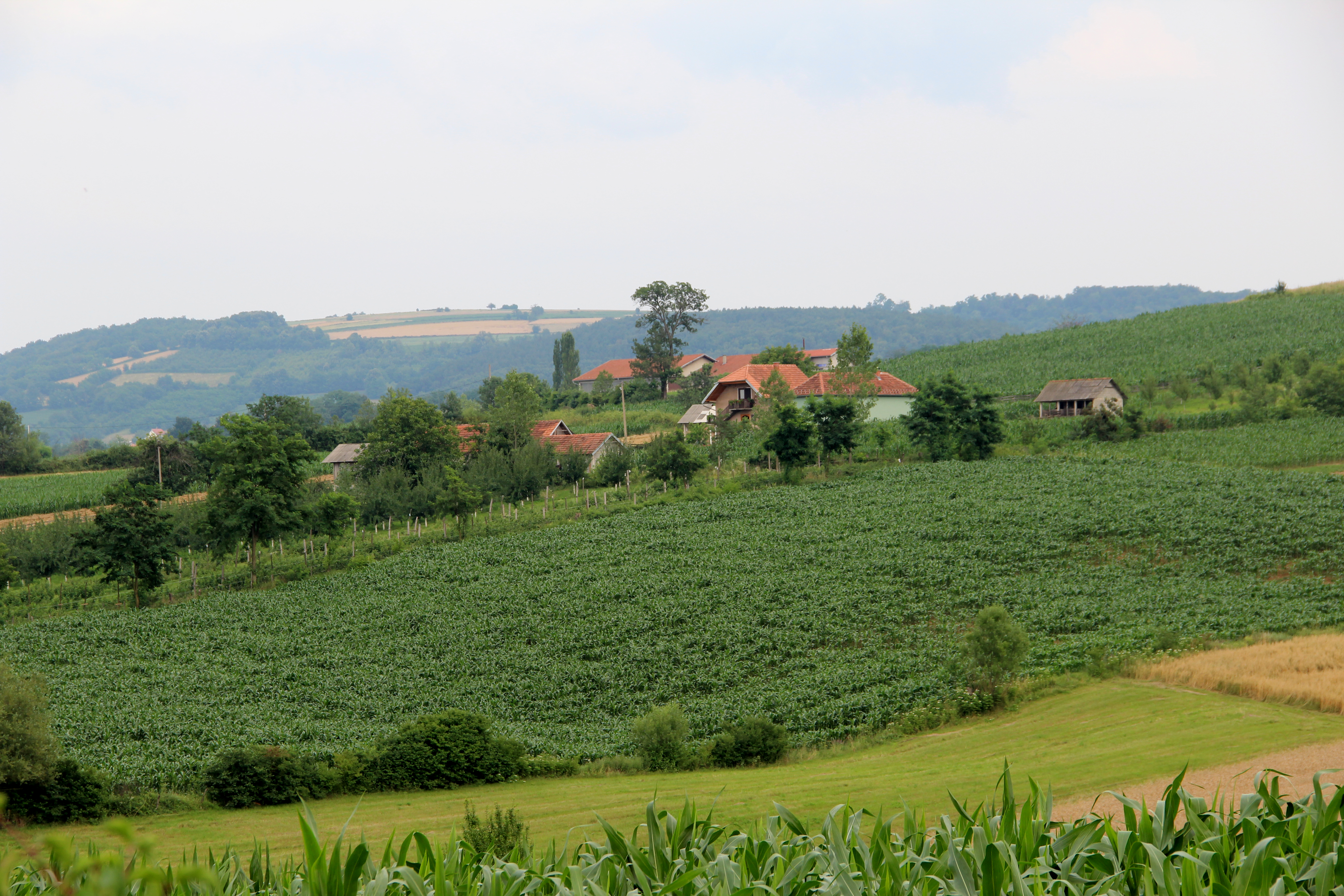
Žabari - panorama

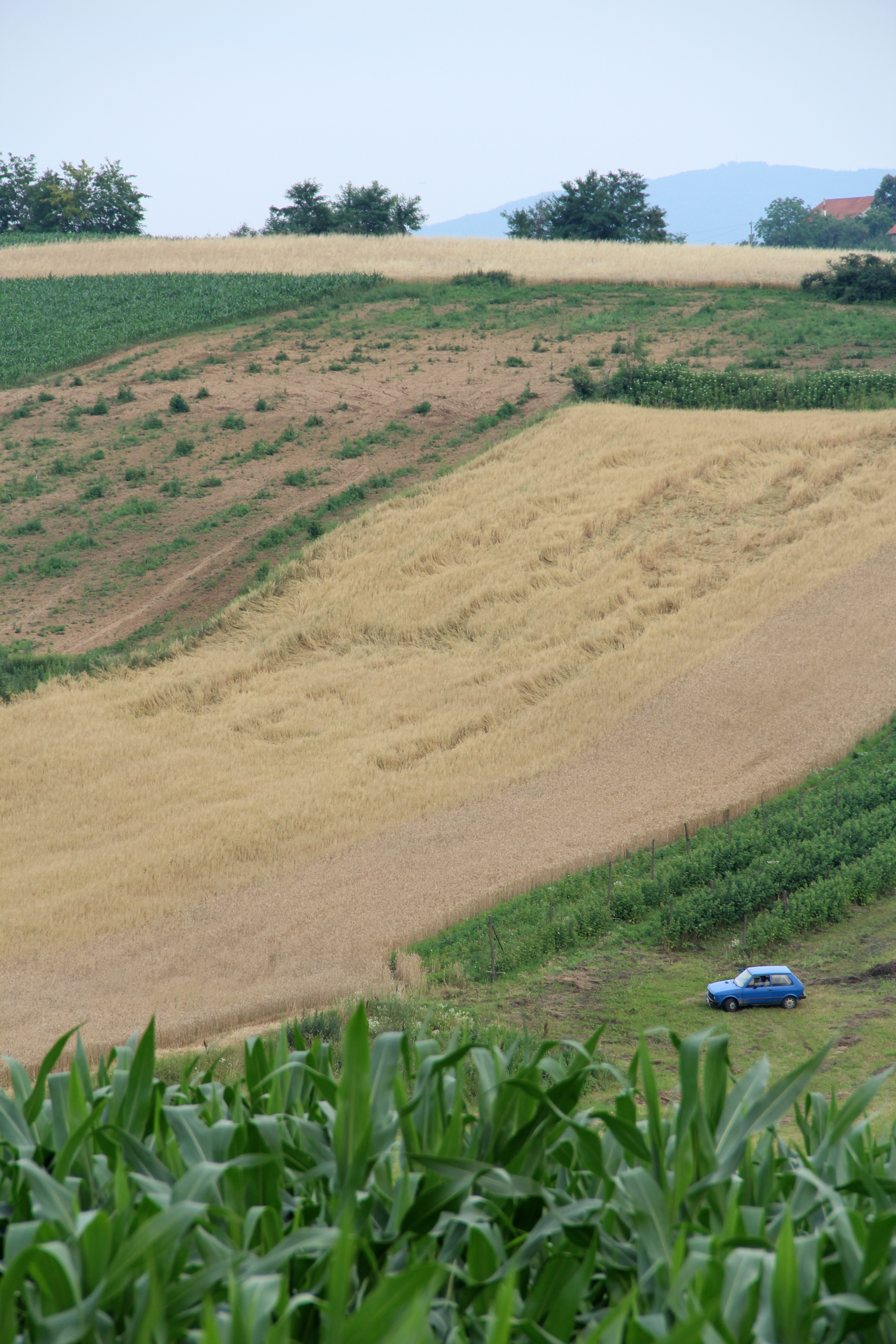
Žabari - panorama

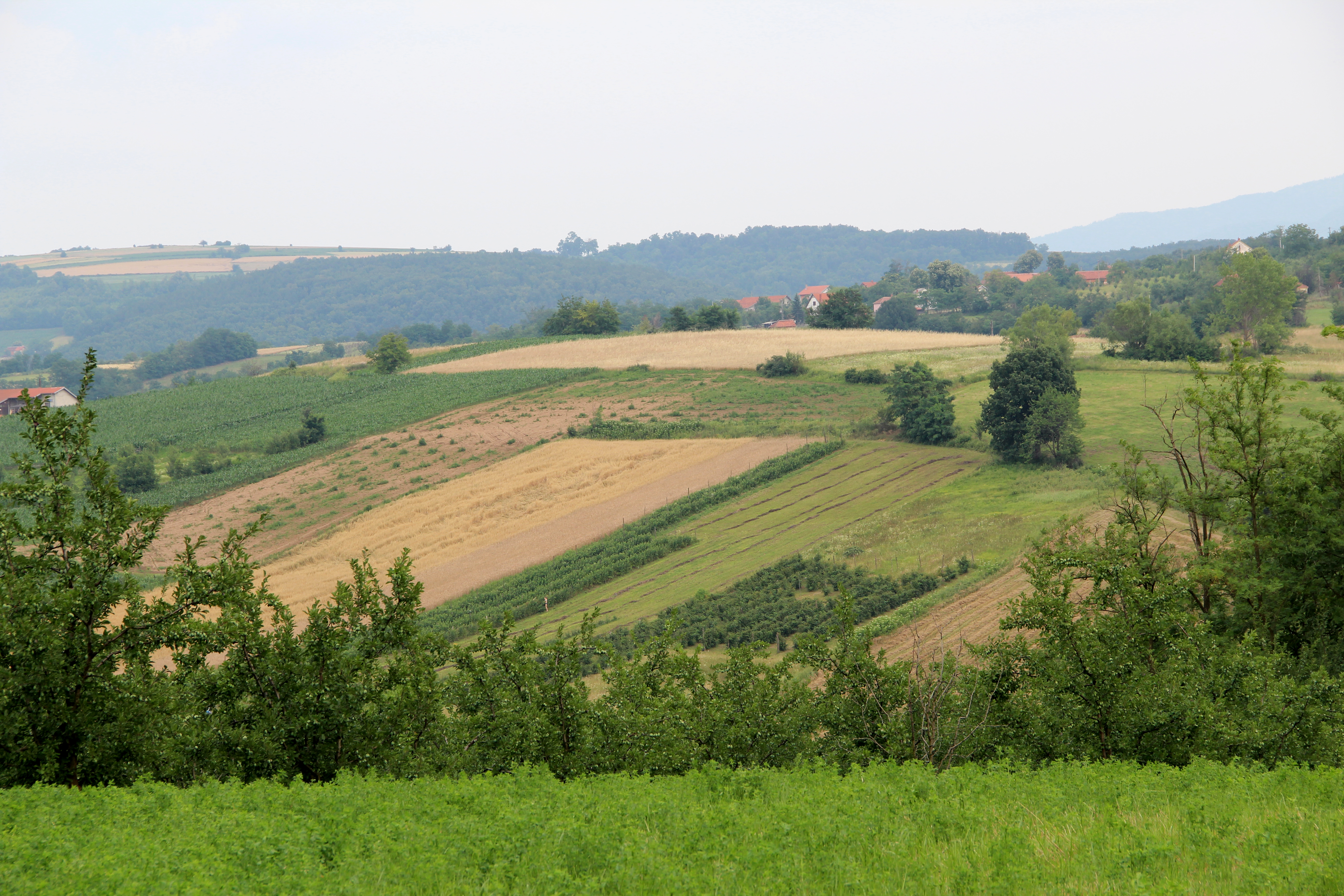
Žabari - panorama

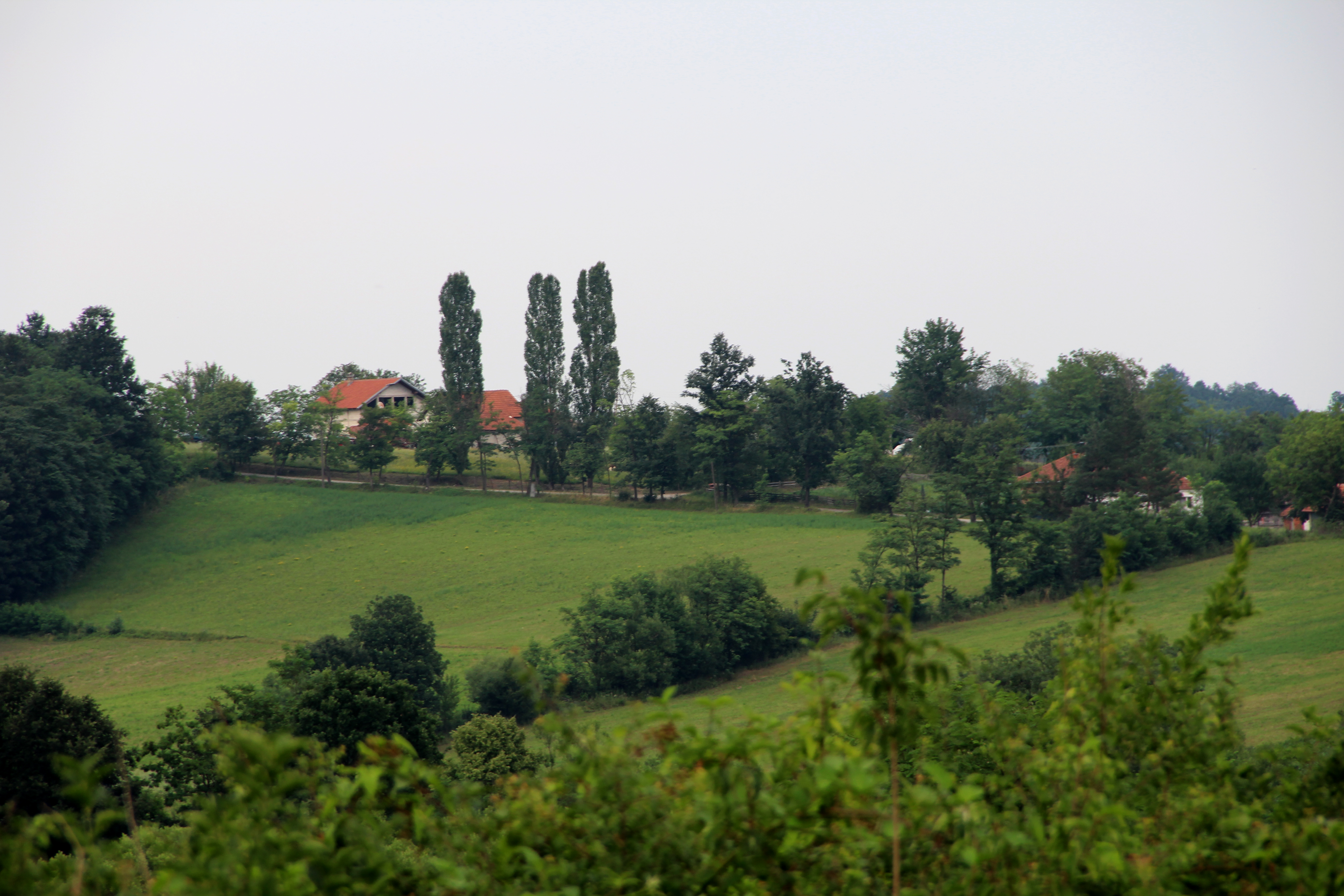
Žabari - panorama

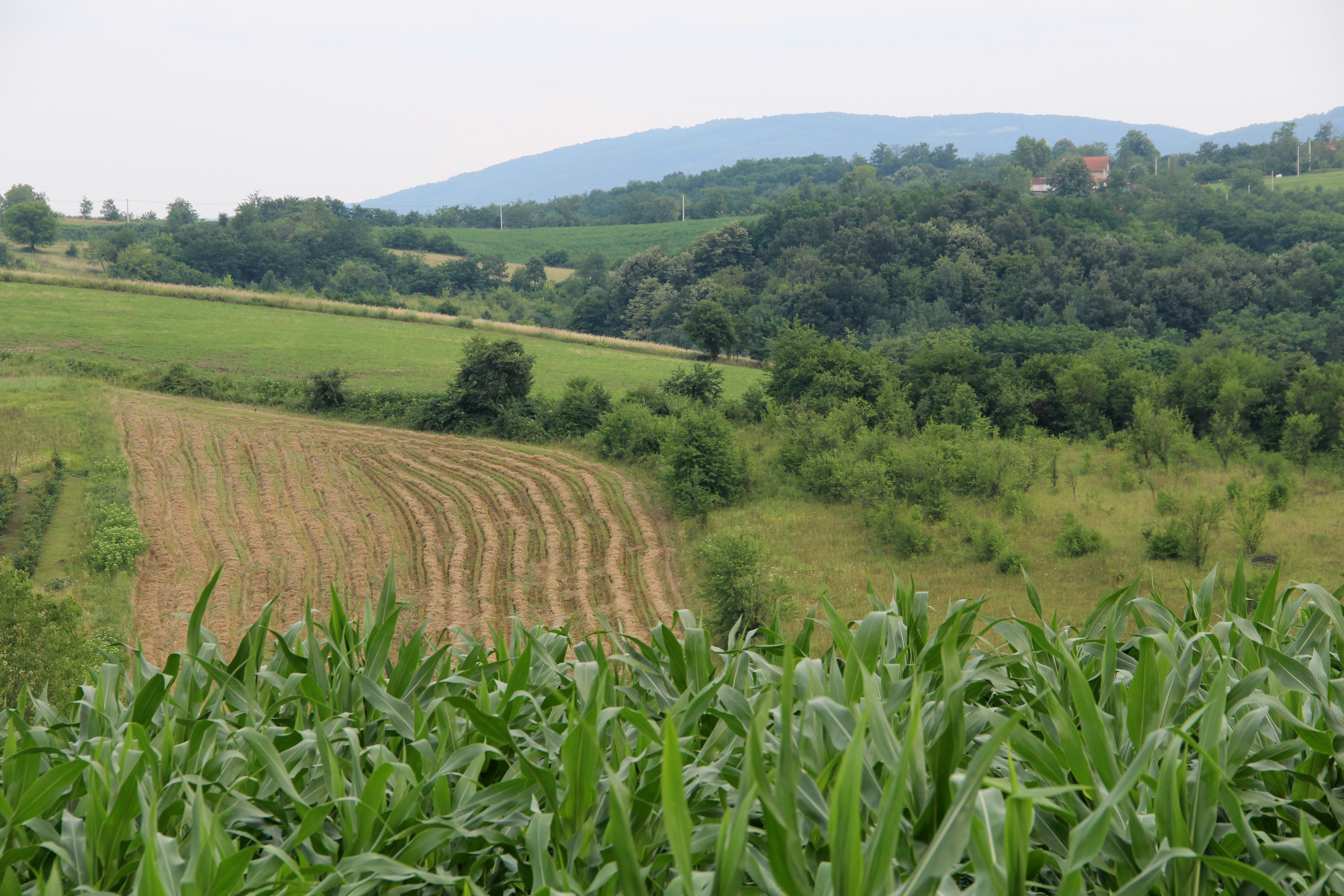
Žabari - panorama

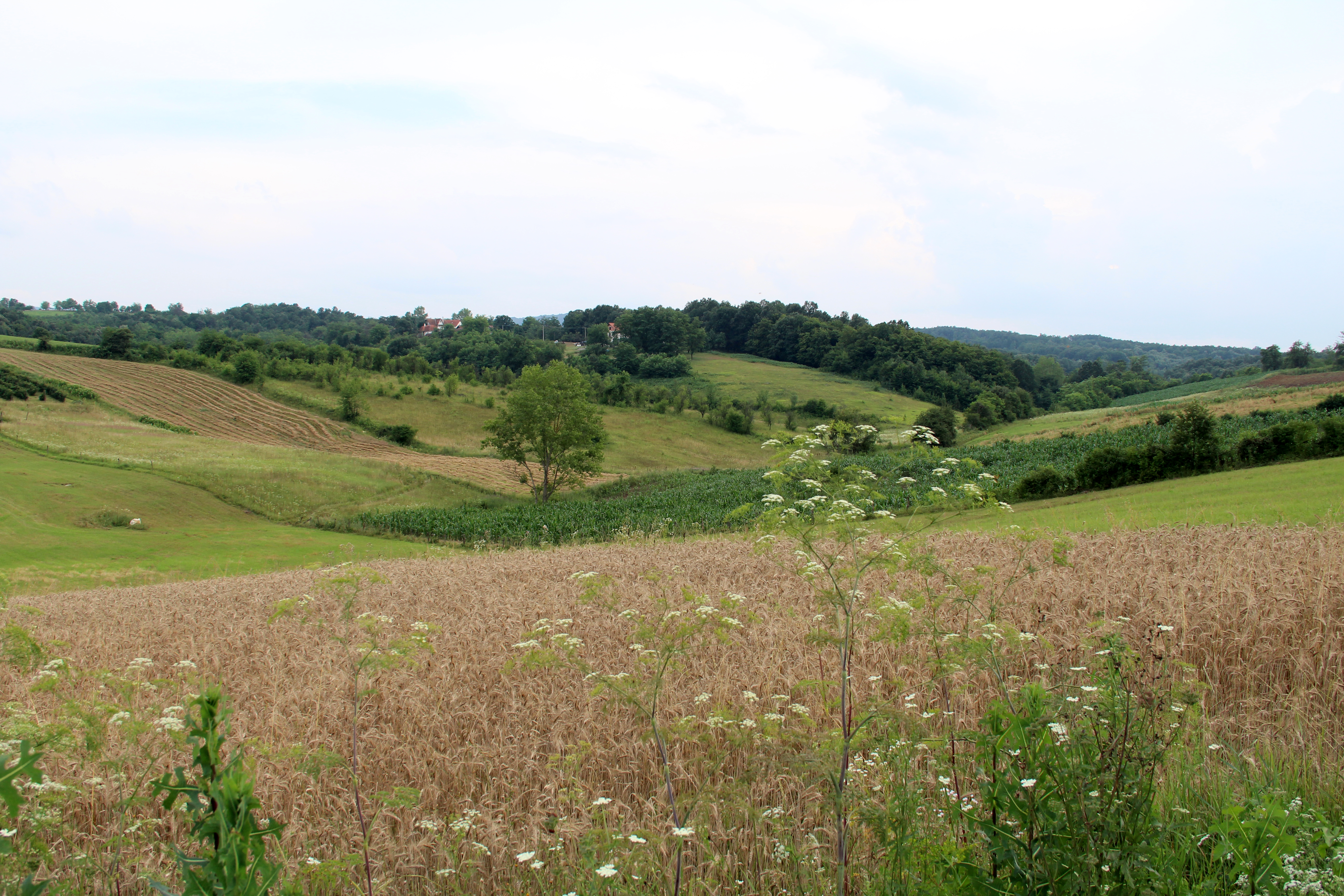
Žabari - panorama

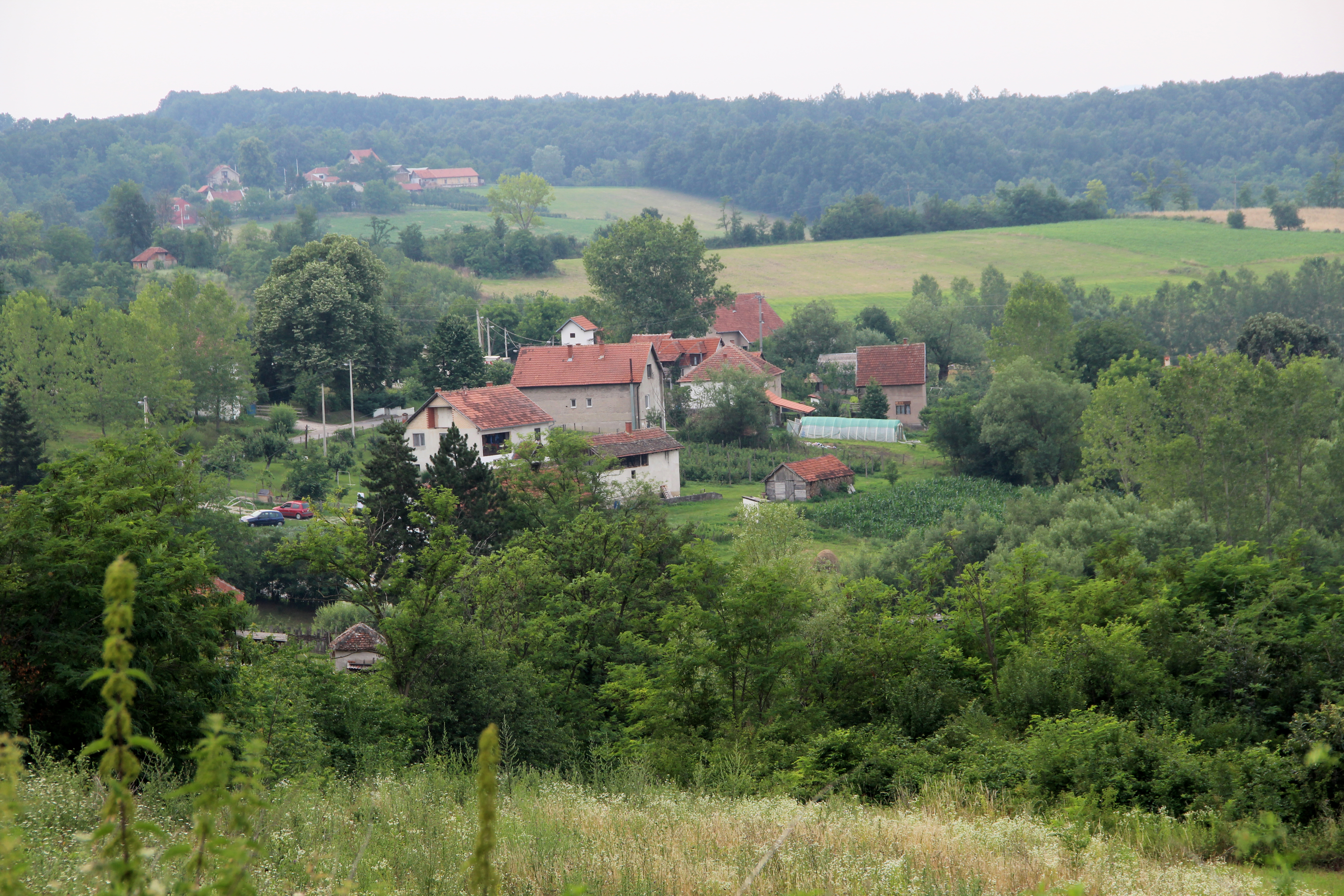
Žabari - panorama

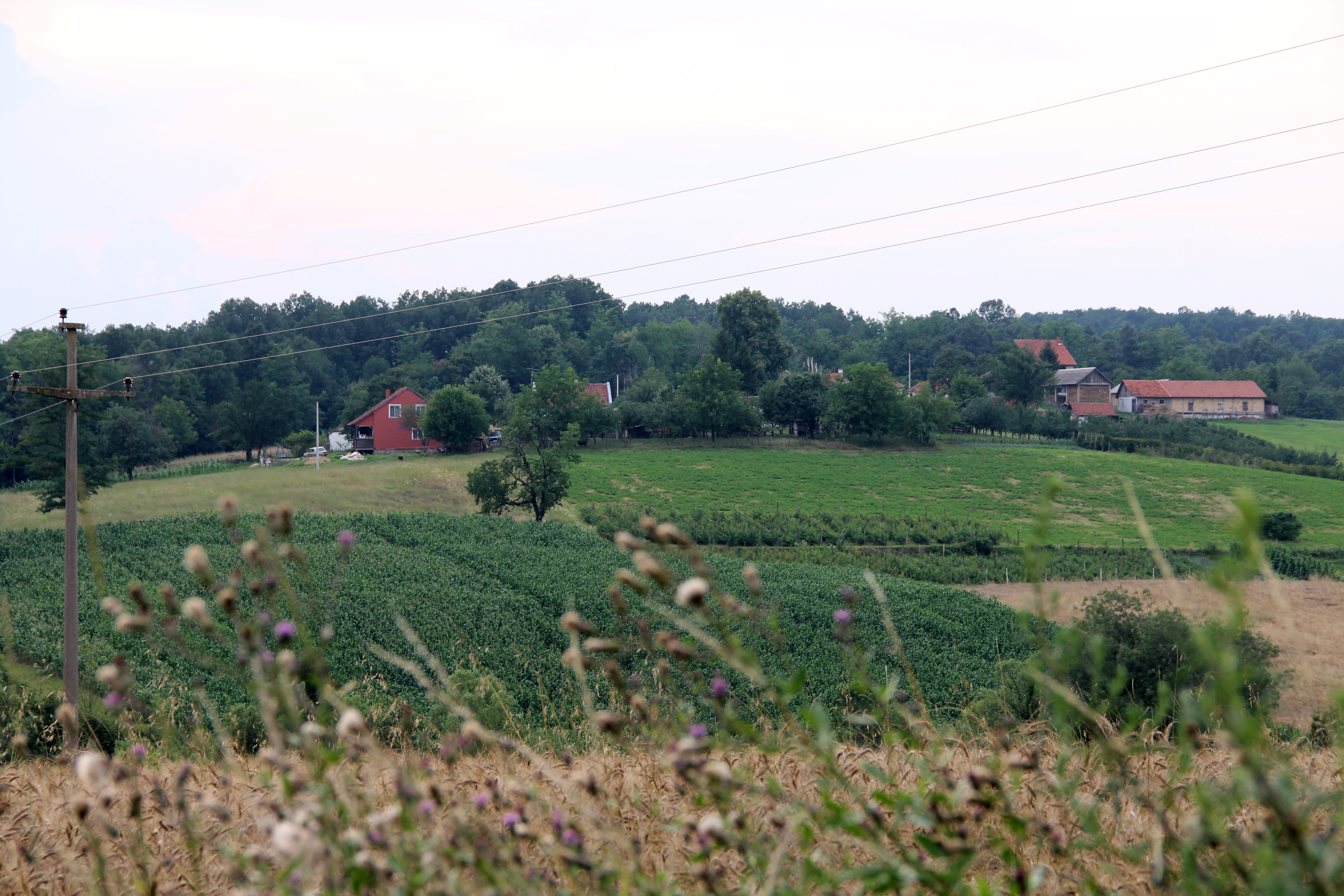
Žabari - panorama

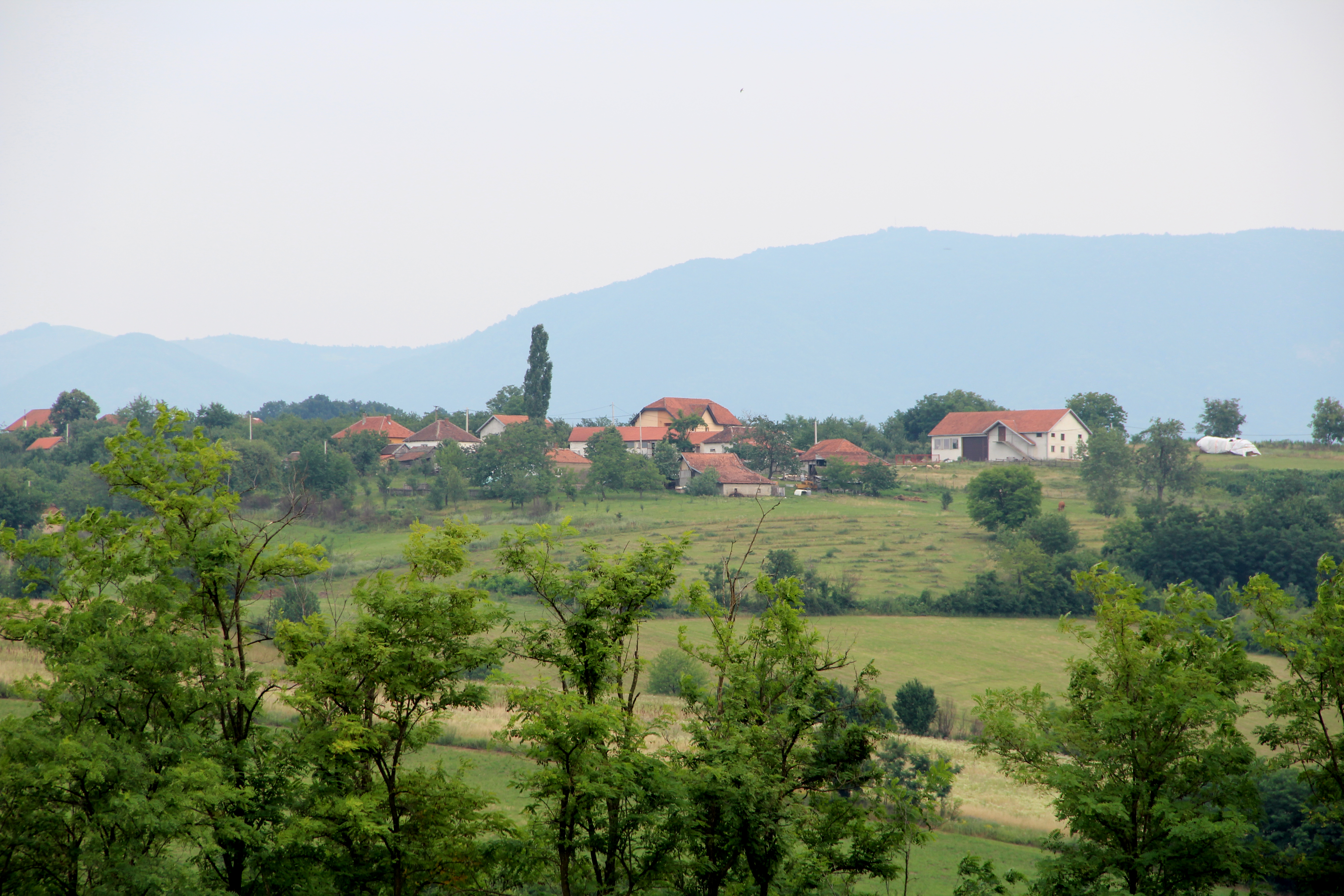
Žabari - panorama

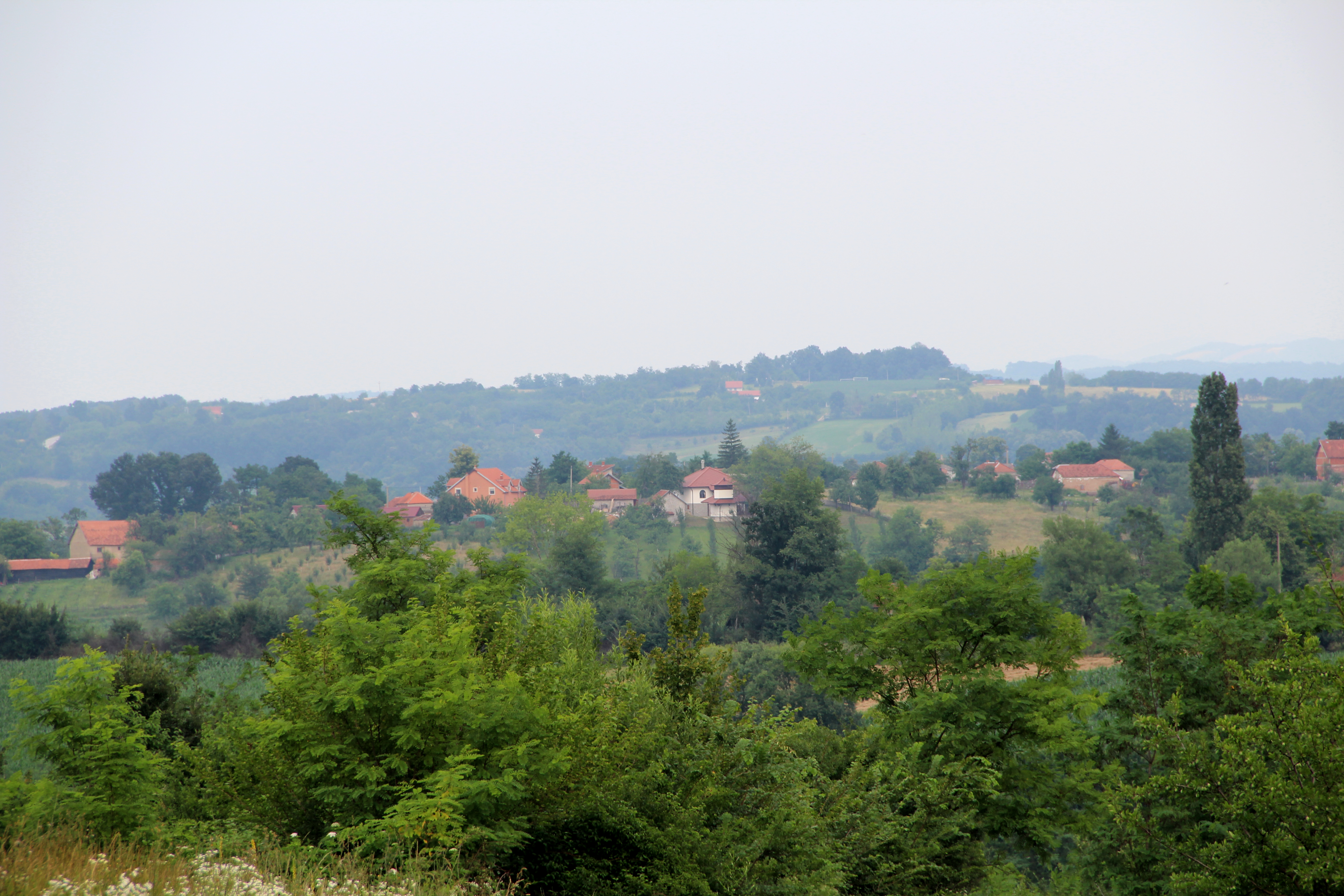
Žabari - panorama

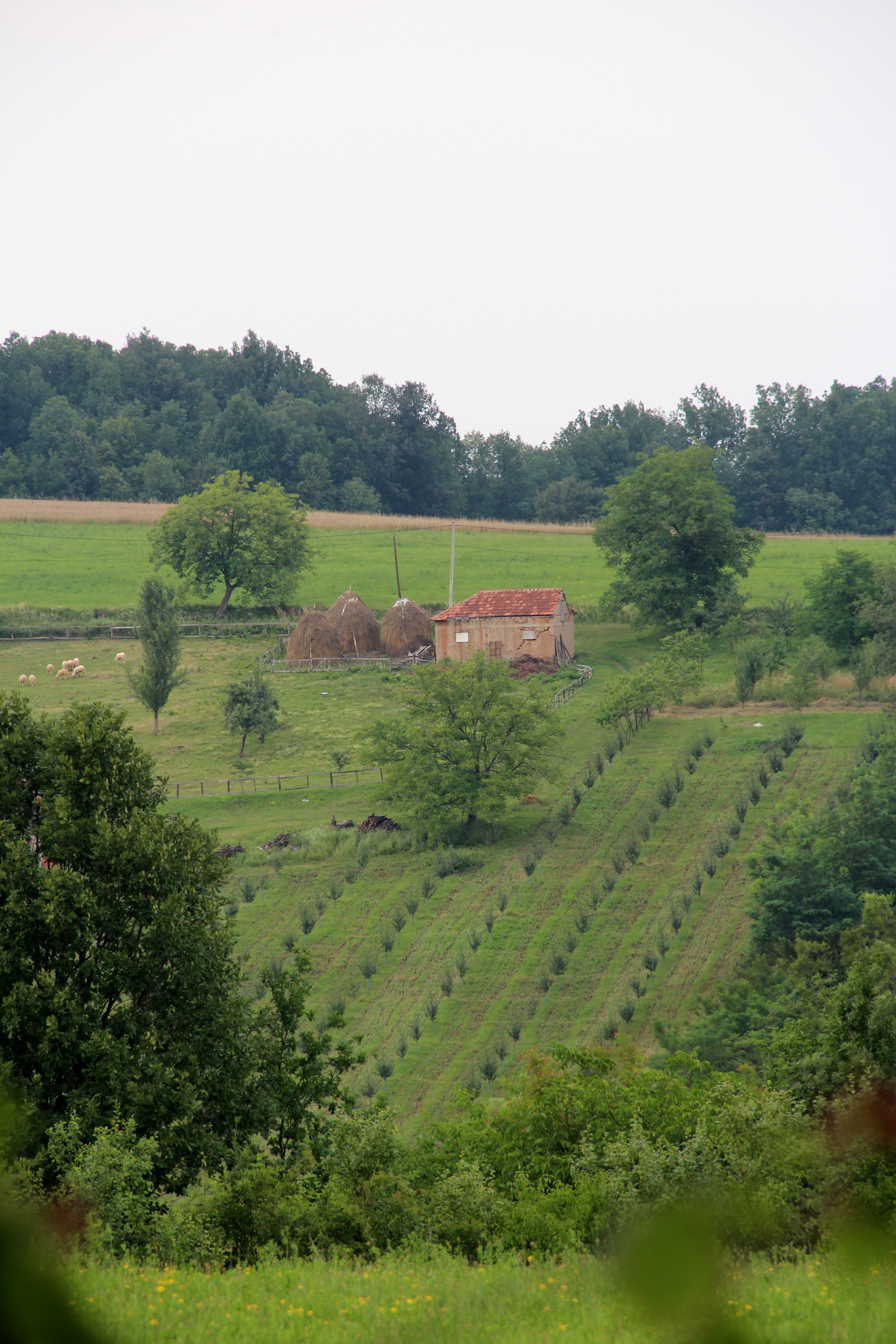
Žabari - panorama
