= Klanica =

Klanica Кланица
- Village (Selo)
- Location within Serbia
- Coordinates: 44°19′N 20°01′E
- Country: Serbia
- District: Kolubara District
- Municipality: Valjevo

Population (2002)
  - Total: 590
- Time zone: UTC+1 (CET)
  - Summer (DST): UTC+2 (CEST)

Klanica is a village in the municipality of Valjevo, Serbia. According to the 2002 census, the village has a population of 590 people.

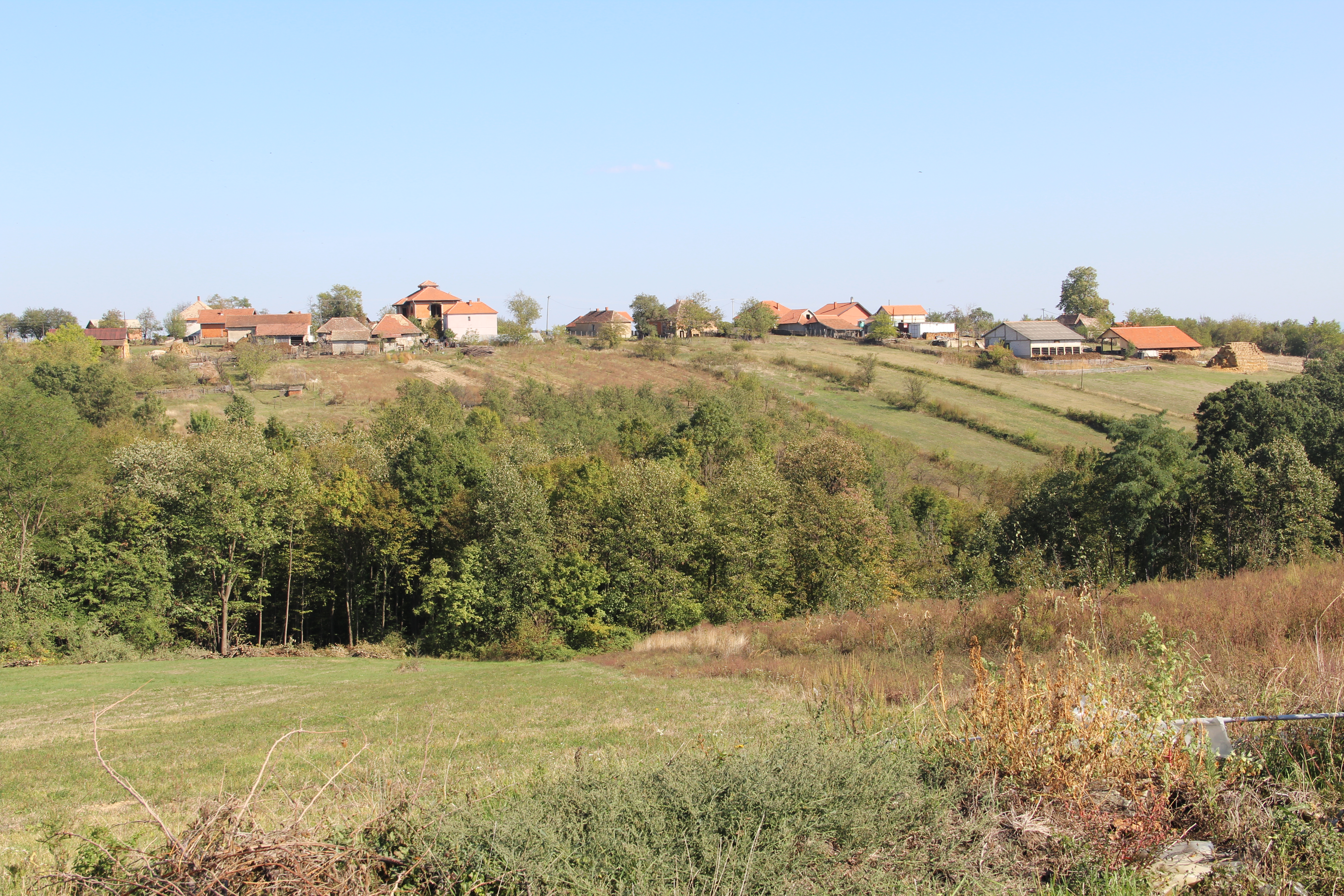
Klanica - Panorama

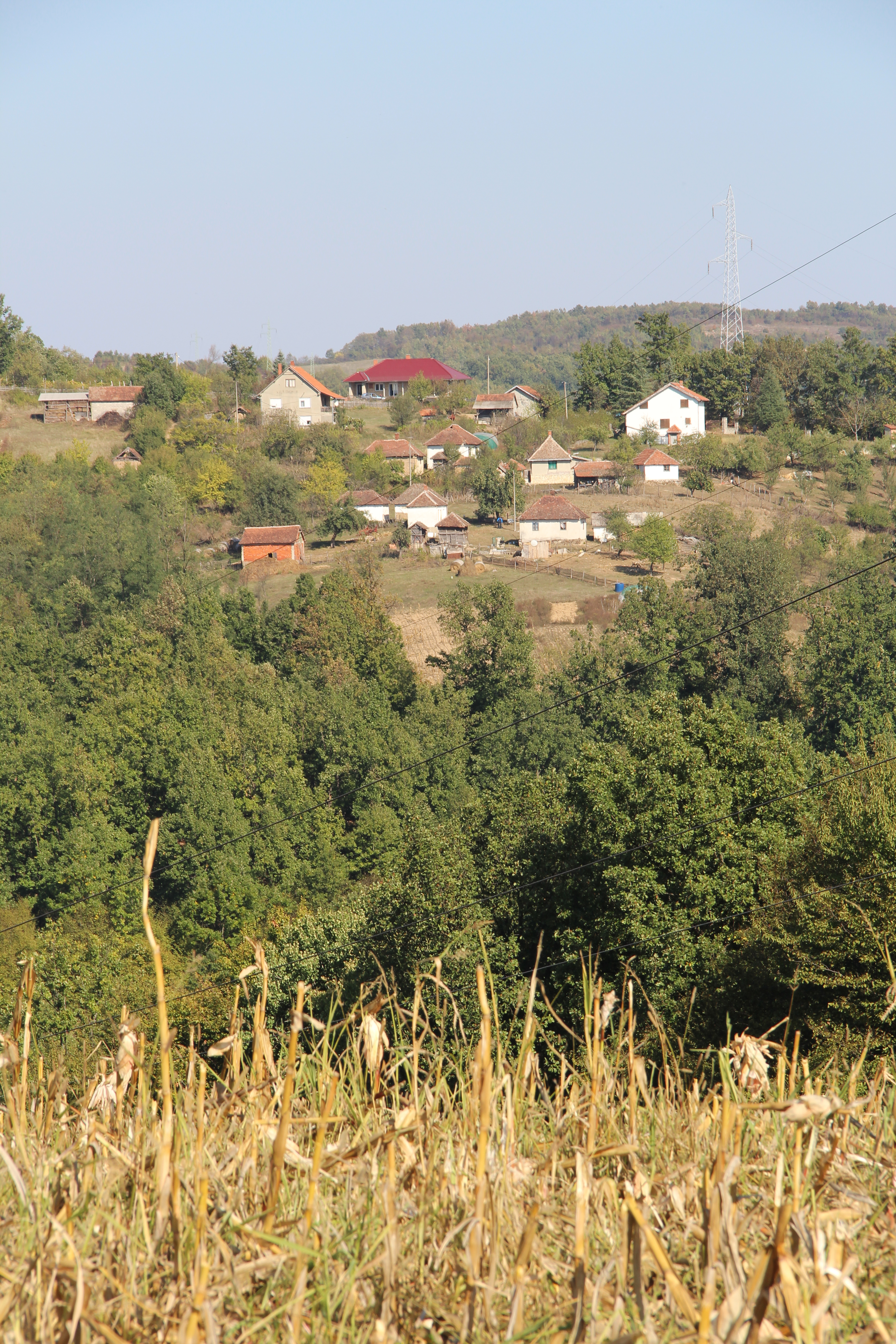
Klanica - Panorama

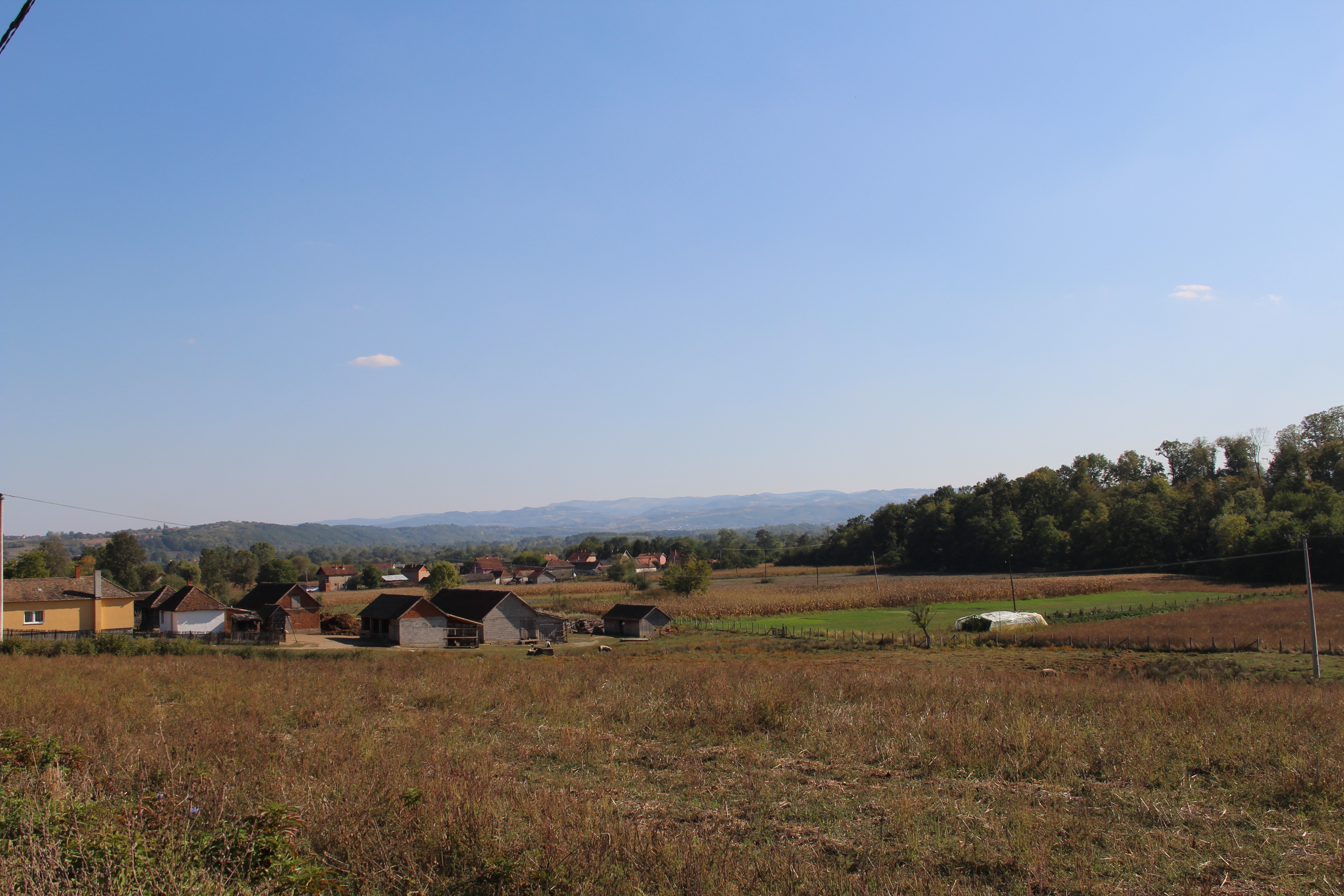
Klanica - Panorama

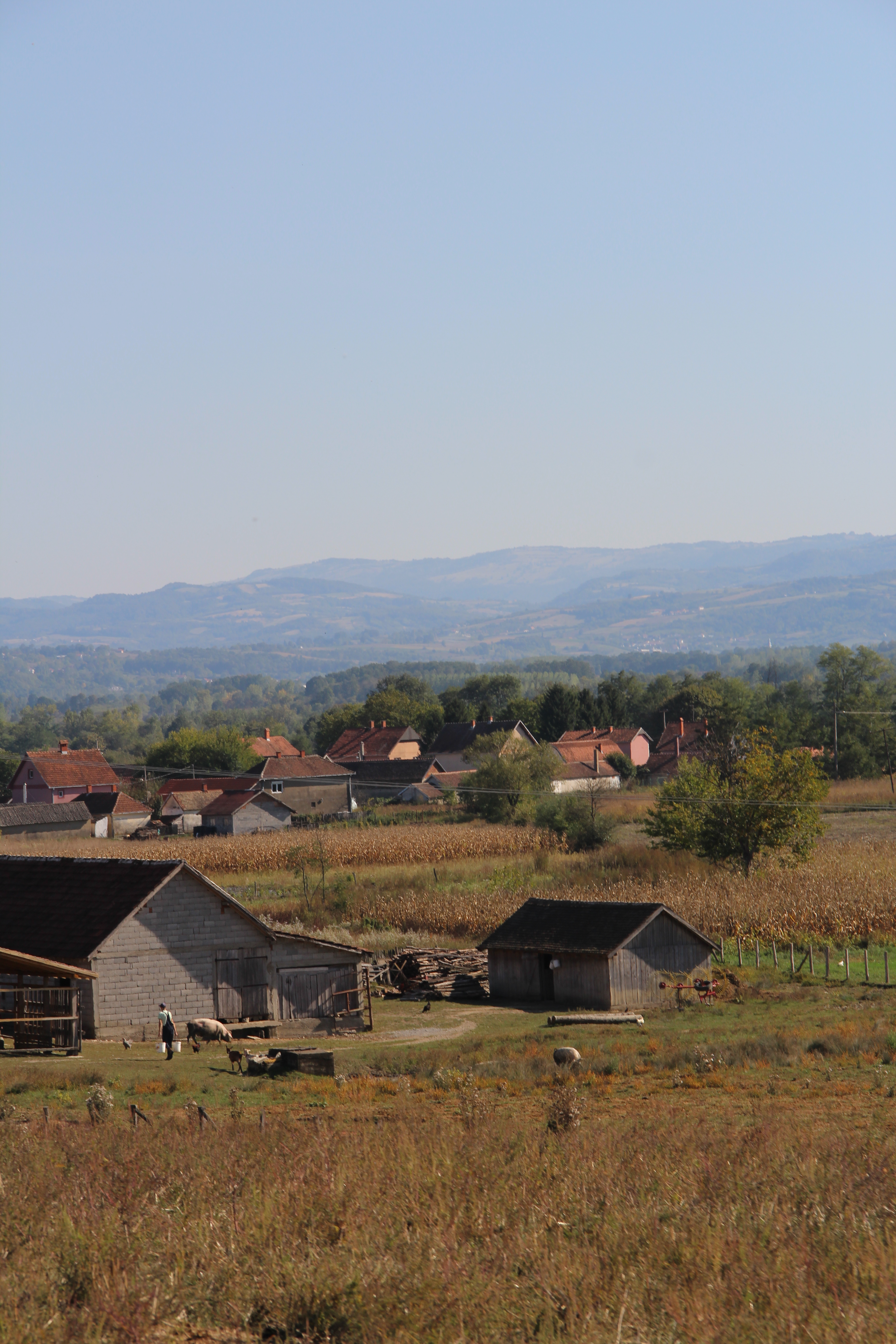
Klanica - Panorama

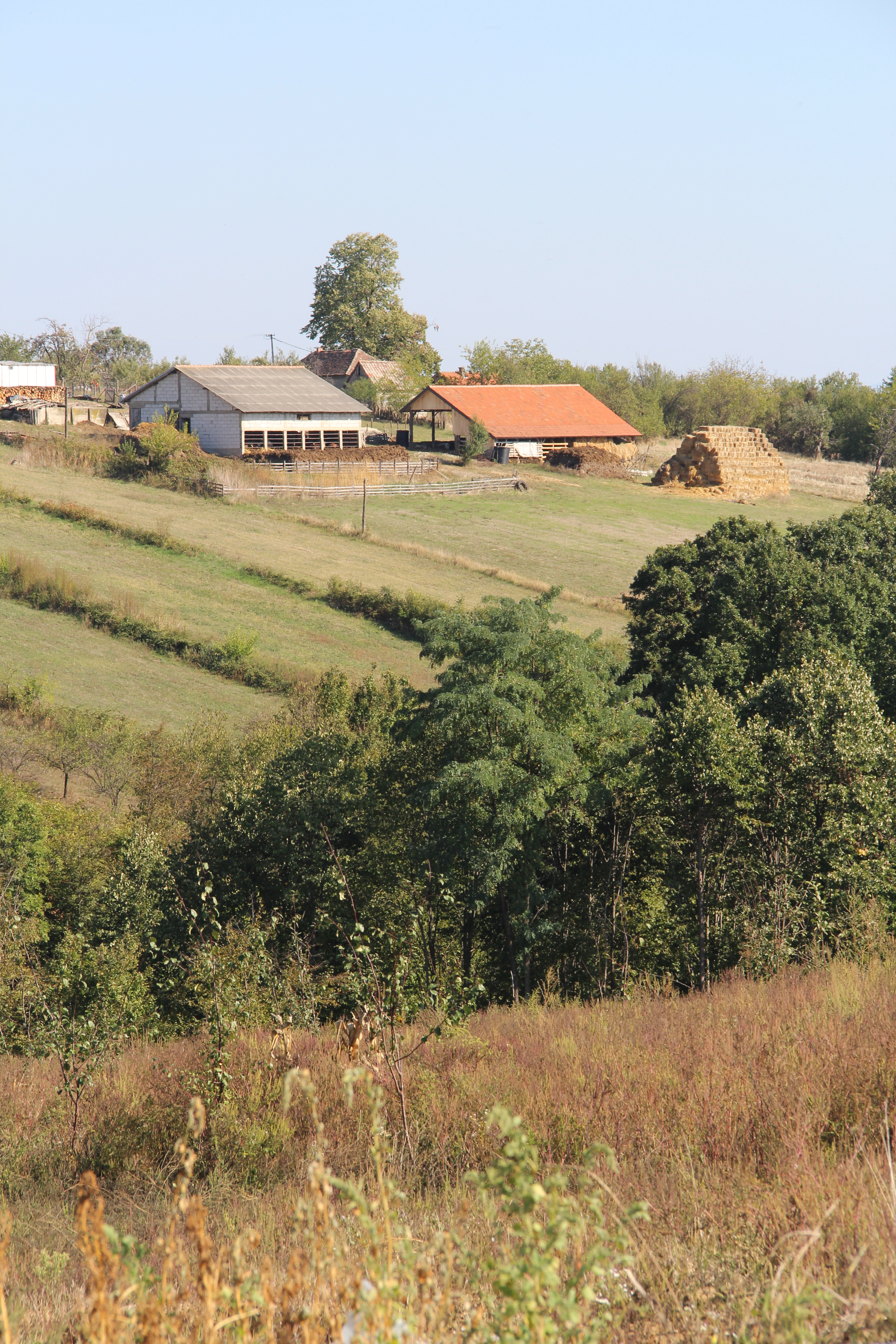
Klanica - Panorama

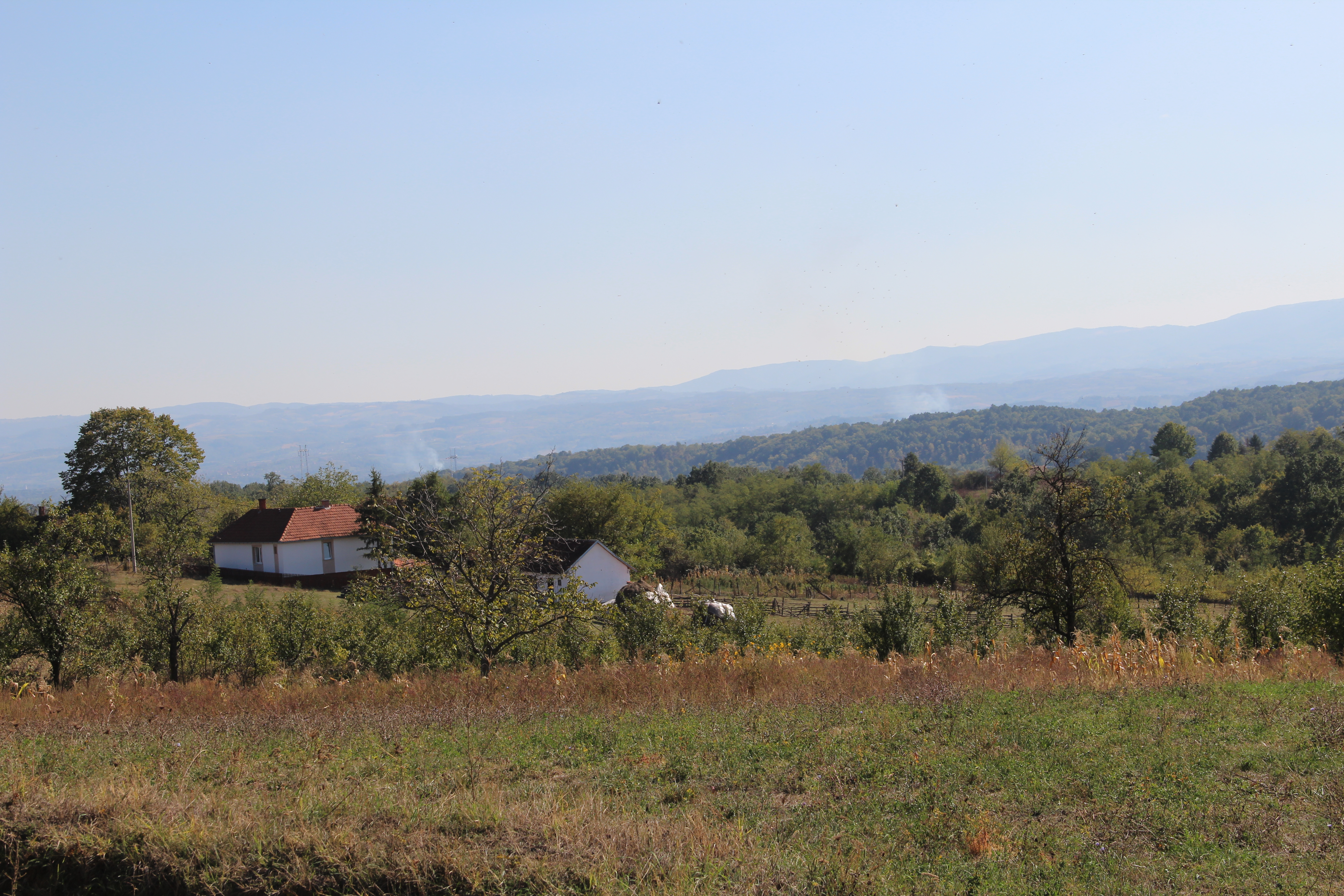
Klanica - Panorama

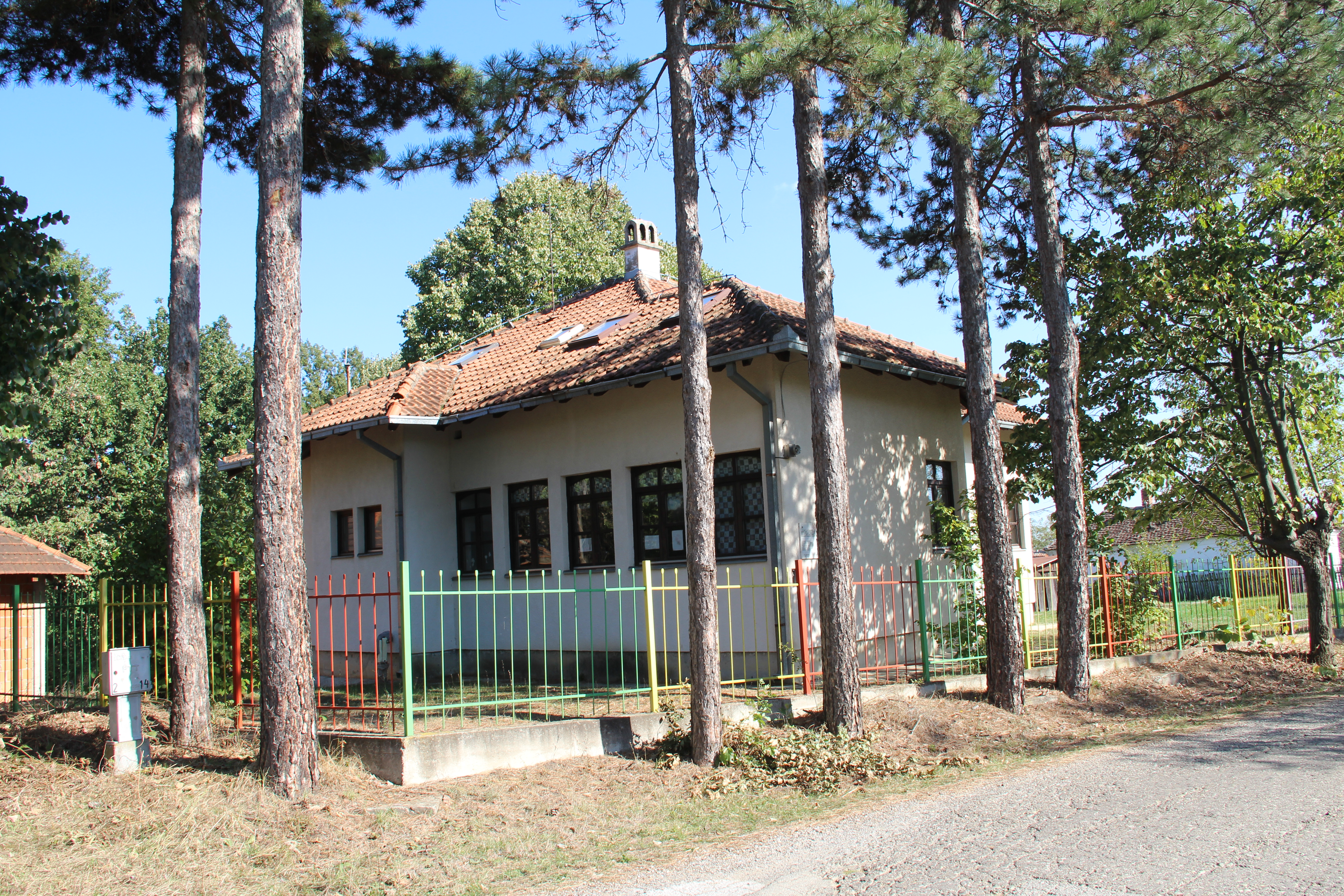
Klanica - School

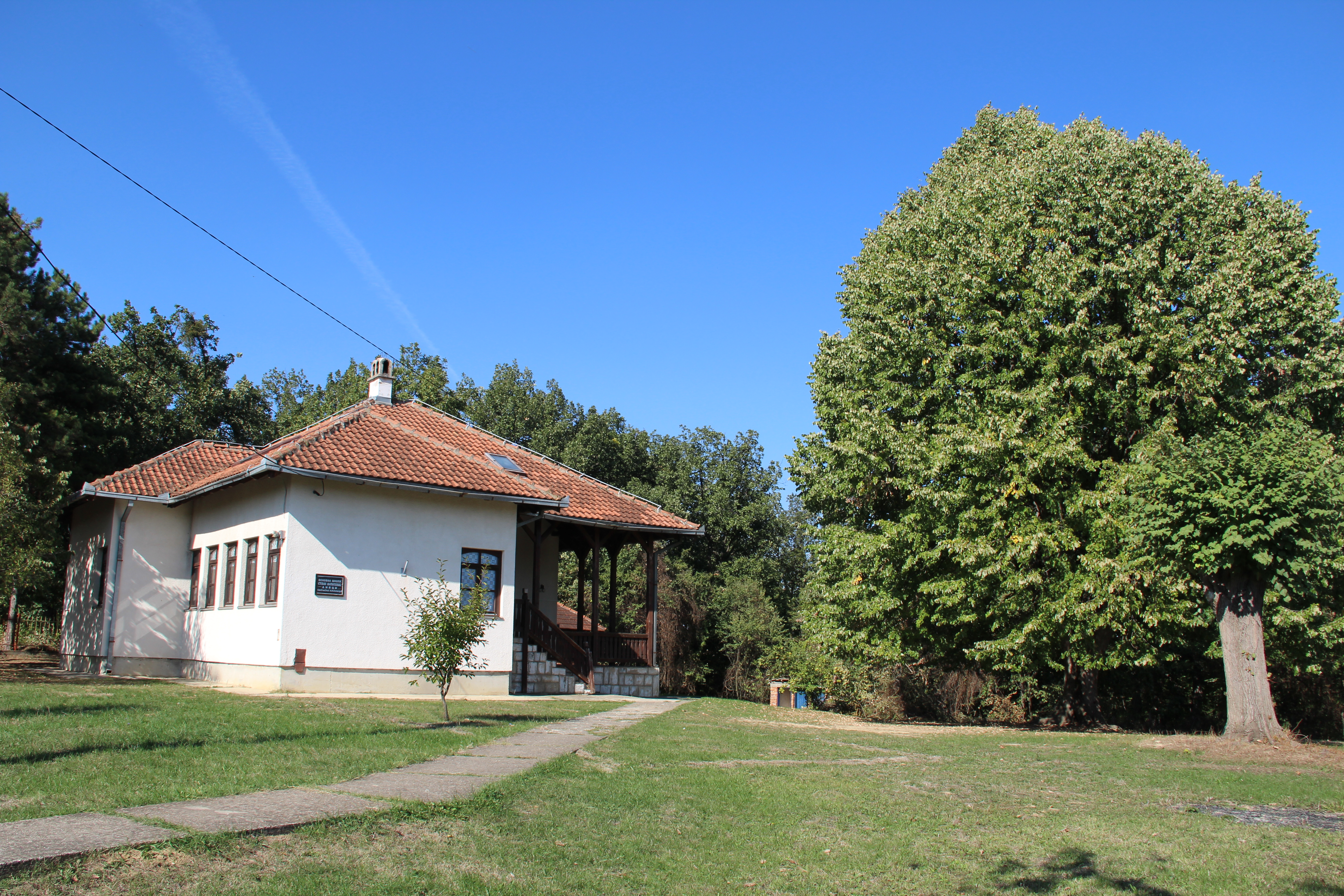
Klanica - School

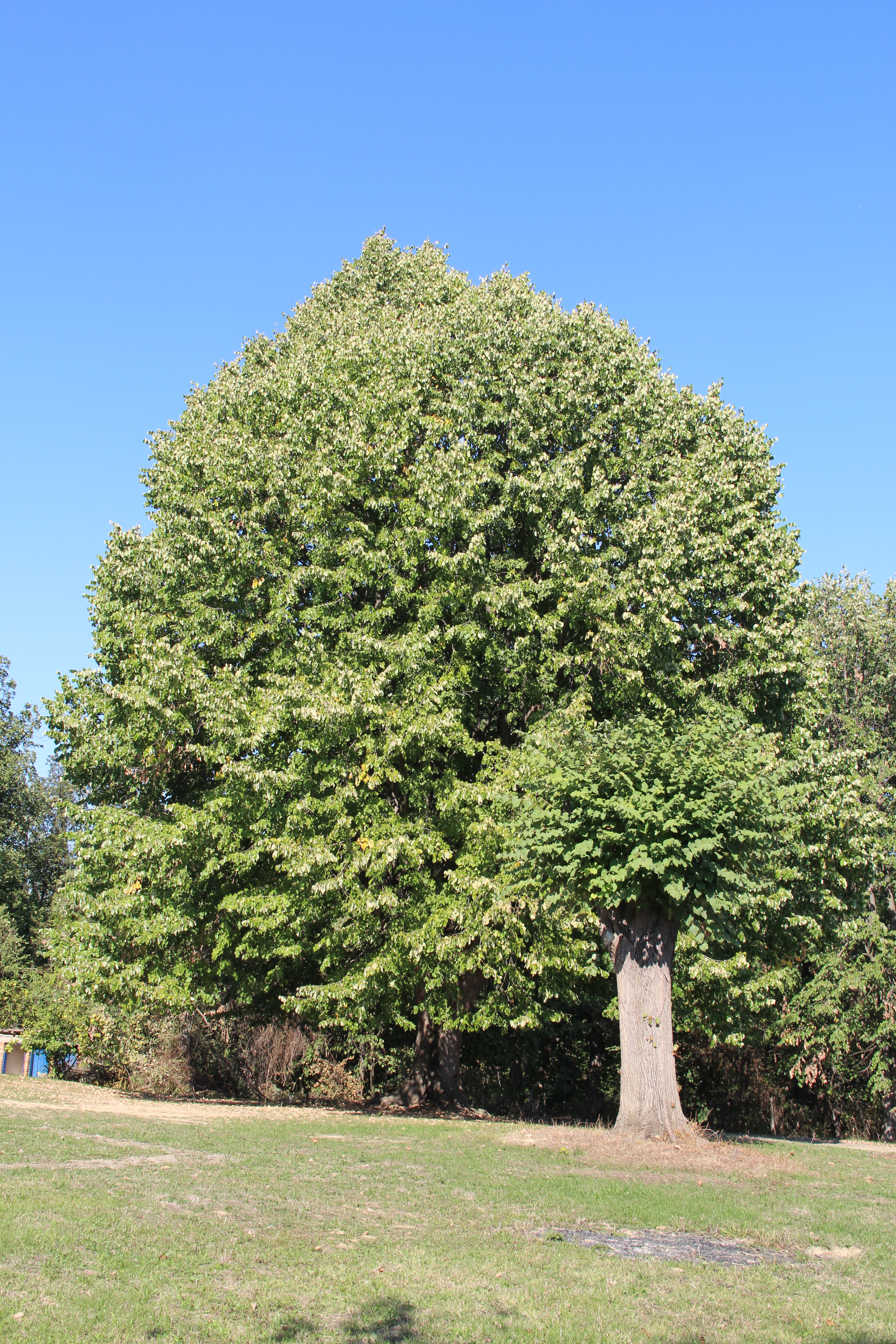
Klanica - Old lime tree in the school yard

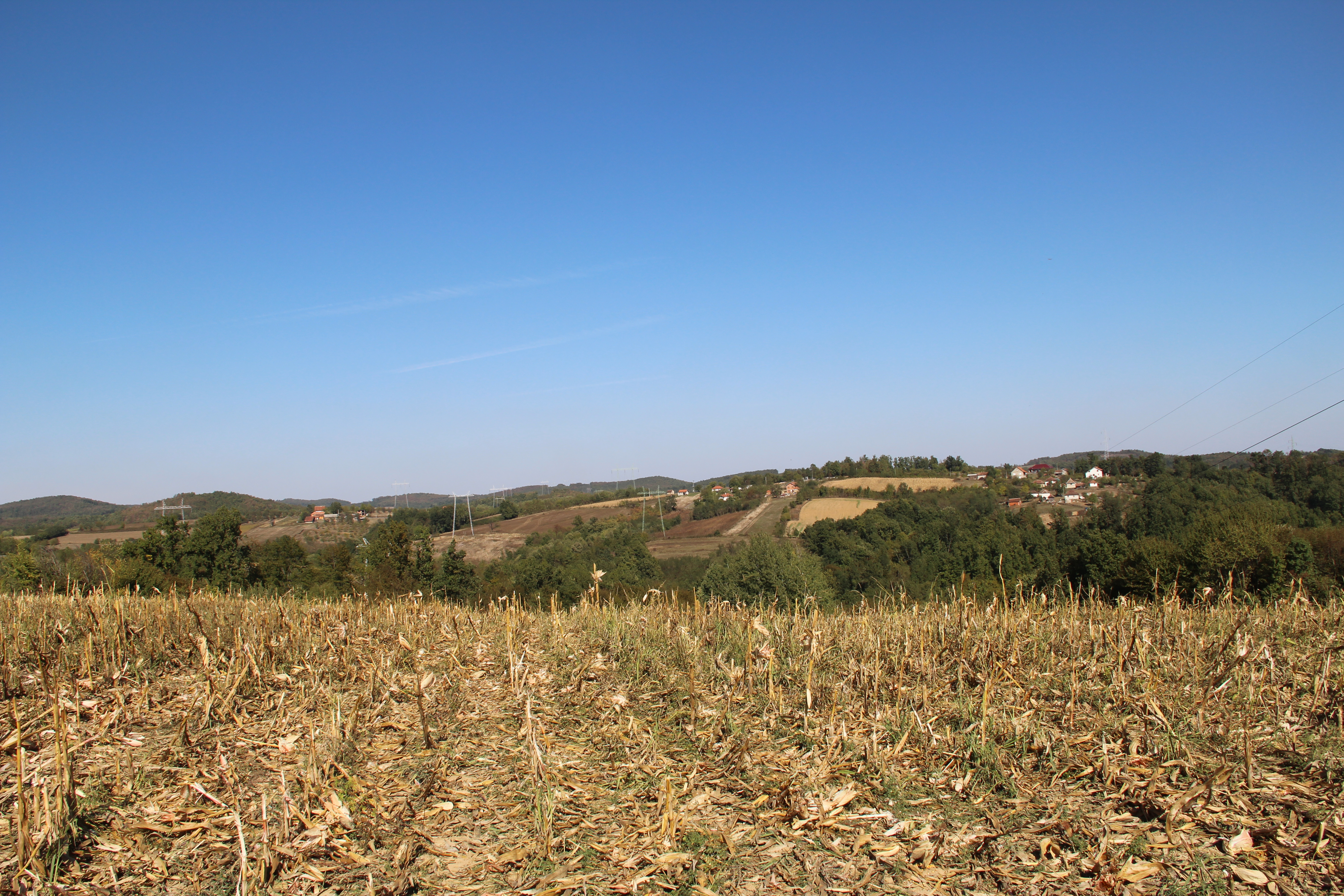
Klanica - Panorama
