= Majdan =

Majdan may refer to:

== People ==
- Dušan Majdán (born 1987), Slovak racewalker
- Joanna Majdan-Gajewska (born 1988), Polish chess player (née Majdan)
- Juraj Majdan (born 1991), Slovak ice hockey player
- Radosław Majdan (born 1972), Polish former football goalkeeper
- Vladimír Majdan (born 1999), Slovak footballer

== Places ==
=== Poland ===
- Majdan, Białystok County, a village
- Majdan, Garwolin County, a village
- Majdan, Gmina Łochów, a village
- Majdan, Gmina Stoczek, a village
- Majdan, Gmina Wierzbno, a village
- Majdan, Gmina Wojsławice, a village
- Majdan, Gmina Żmudź, a village
- Majdan, Hajnówka County, a settlement
- Majdan, Hrubieszów County, a village
- Majdan, Janów County, a village
- Majdan, Lesko County, a hamlet
- Majdan, Mińsk County, a village
- Majdan, Ostrołęka County, a village
- Majdan, Otwock County, a village
- Majdan, Suwałki County, a village
- Majdan, Gmina Telatyn, Tomaszów County, a settlement
- Majdan, Warmian-Masurian Voivodeship, a settlement
- Majdan, Wołomin County, a village

=== Serbia ===
- Majdan (Gornji Milanovac), a village
- Majdan (Novi Kneževac), a village
- Majdan (Serbian mountain)

=== Elsewhere ===
- Majdan (Fojnica), Bosnia and Herzegovina, a village
- Majdan (Kladanj), Bosnia and Herzegovina, a village
- Majdan, Zavidovići, Bosnia and Herzegovina, a village
- Majdan (mountain in Kosovo)

== See also ==
- Maidan (disambiguation)
