= List of mountains named Majdan =

Majdan is the name of the following mountains:

- Majdan (mountain in Kosovo)
- Majdan (Serbian mountain)
