= Oplanići =

Oplanići Опланићи (Serbian)
- Village (Selo)
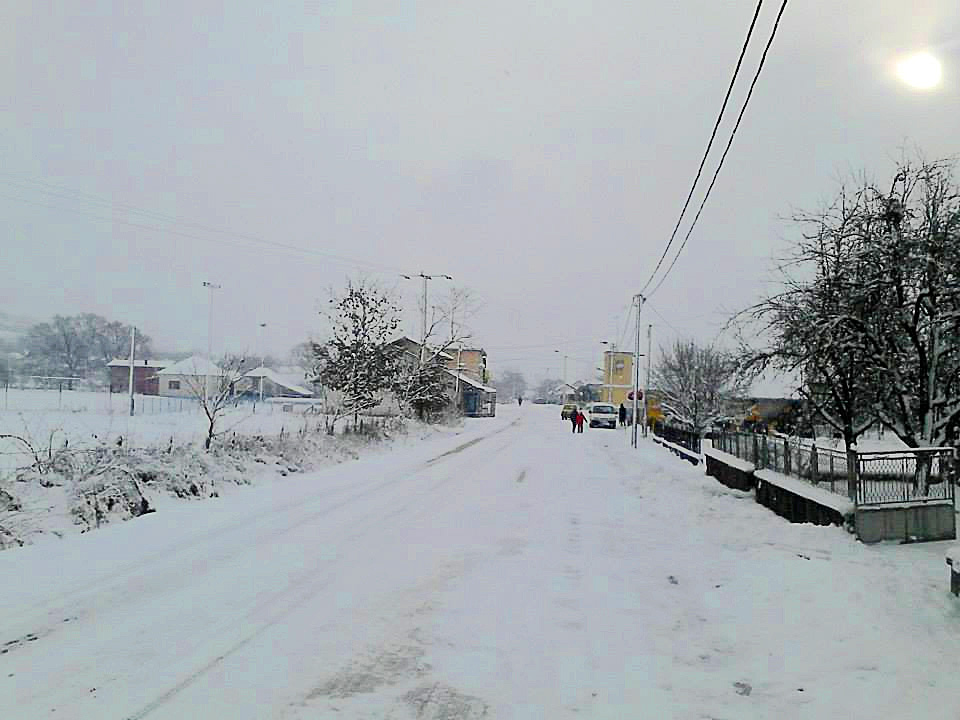

- Location within Serbia
- Coordinates: 43°43′31.8″N 20°40′30.6″E
- Country: Serbia
- District: Raška District
- Municipality: Kraljevo

Population (2011)
  - Total: 899
- Time zone: UTC+1 (CET)
  - Summer (DST): UTC+2 (CEST)
- Postal code: 36000
- Area code: +381 36
- Car plates: KV

Oplanići is a town/village Kraljevo in Raska district, situated between the mountains Kotlenik and Stolovi, along the coast of the West Morava. It is home to some 900 people, most of which are adults and pensioners. According to the census of 2011, Oplanići has 899 inhabitants.

== History ==
The name Oplanići is first mentioned in 1428-1429, presumably under the name Platov, 1528 (18 houses), as Svinjci in 1560 (14 houses), and as under its current name, in 1844 (46 houses and 268 inhabitants) and 1924 (115 homes and 730 houses). On maps from the year 1700, the first charted place was Oplanići, exactly at the place where the border between Austria and Turkey lied. Through the centuries, the village has grown and developed and with it the habits and tradition of the local populace has changed drastically.

== Geography ==
On the left side of the West Morava, at the foot of Kotlenik lies the village of Oplanići, in between Sirča towards the east, and Miločaj towards the west. Oplanići is located 7 km from the city of Kraljevo. The village is situated at 271 metres above sea level. Oplanići is surrounded by Sirča, Popovici and Trgovište to the left side of Western Morava, and Grdica and Adrani to the right.

== Church of the Holy Archangel Gabriel in Oplanići ==
The church in Oplanići is dedicated to the Holy Archangel Gabriel, built by Annex villagers Oplanići and Popović in the period between 1989 and 1991. In the same place there is a wooden church, which, according to tradition, was built during the great migration of Serbs, by the Serbian Orthodox Church.

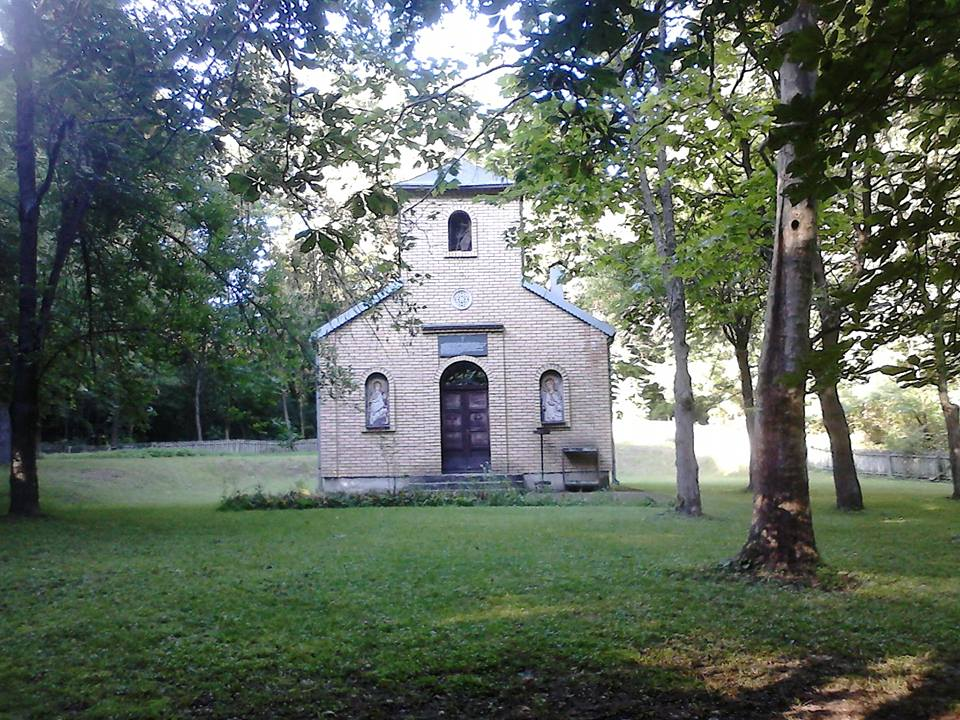

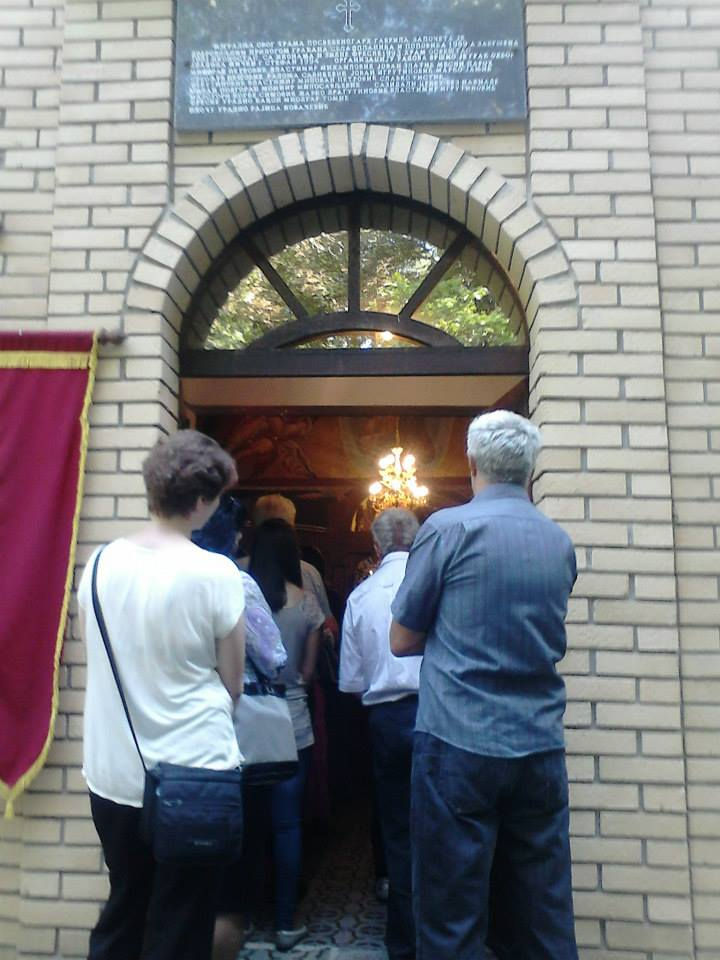

== Demography ==
Oplanići is inhabited by 750 adults, and the average age is 43.2 years (41.7 for males and 44.7 for females). The village has 289 households, and the average number of members per household is 3.25. This village is largely populated by Serbs (according to the 2002 census). In the last three censuses, Oplanići has noticed a decline in population.
