= Božac =

Božac may refer to:

- Božac, a mountain in southwestern Serbia, part of Stojkovačka planina
- Dalibor Božac, a former Croatian football defender
- Franko Božac, a classical accordion performer
