= Bič =

Bič may refer to:

- Bić, a mountain on the border of Serbia and Bosnia and Herzegovina
- Bič, Slovenia, a village in the Trebnje municipality in eastern Slovenia
