= Malic =

Malic may refer to:

== Places ==
- Malíč, a village in the Czech Republic
- Malič, a mountain in Serbia

== Other uses ==
- Malic acid, an organic compound
- Gruban Malić, a fictional character
- Nedeljko Malić (born 1988), Bosnian footballer

== See also ==
- Malik (disambiguation)
