= List of mountains in Serbia =

Serbia is mountainous, with complex geology and parts of several mountain ranges: Dinaric Alps in the southwest, the northwestern corner of the Rila-Rhodope Mountains in the southeast of the country, Carpathian Mountains in the northeast, and Balkan Mountains and the easternmost section of Srednogorie mountain chain system in the east, separated by a group of dome mountains along the Morava river valley. The northern province of Vojvodina lies in the Pannonian plain, with several Pannonian island mountains. Mountains of Kosovo are listed in a separate article.

== List ==
This is a list of mountains and their highest peaks in Serbia, excluding Kosovo. Mountains that have several major peaks are listed separately.

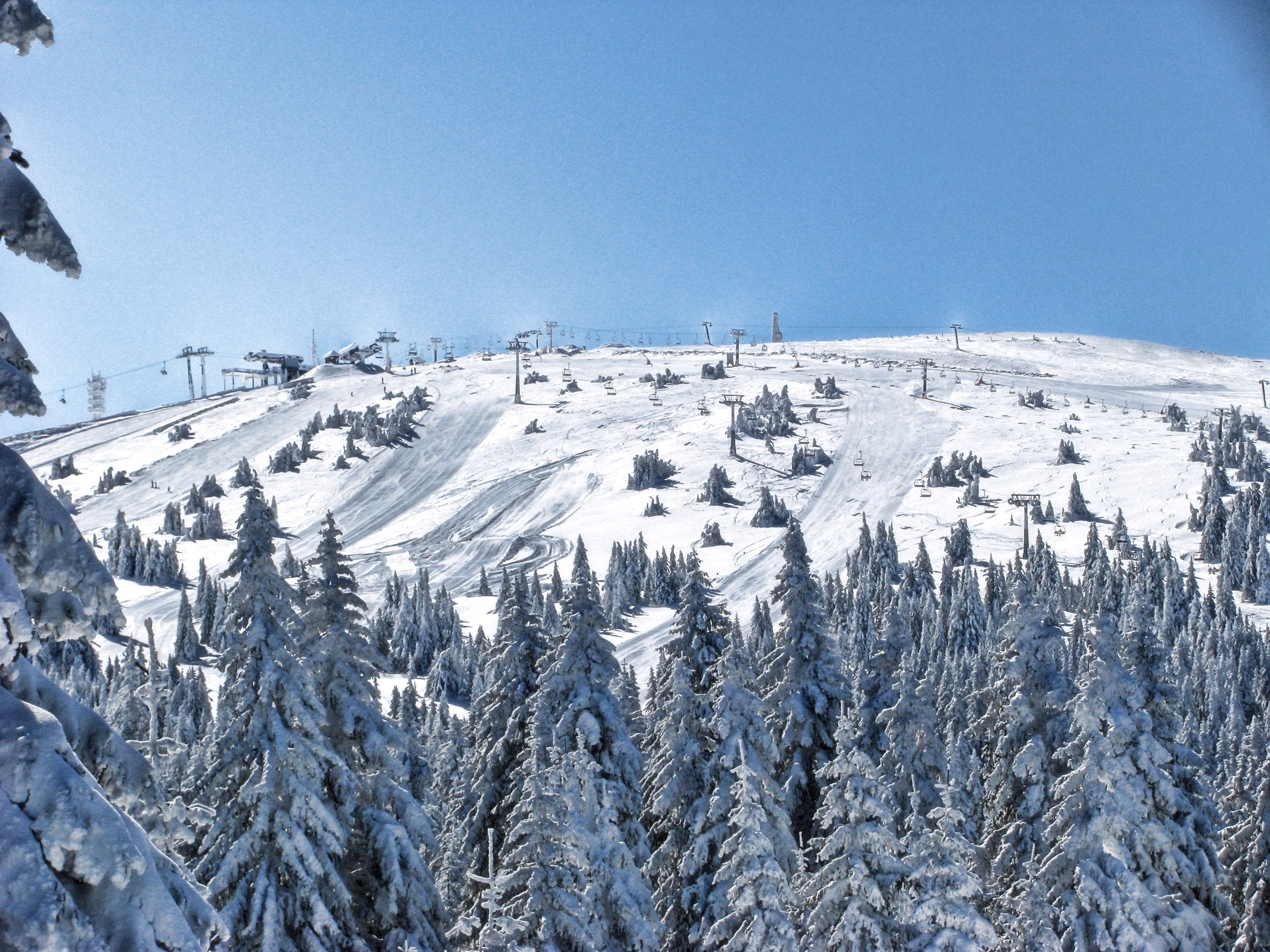
Kopaonik

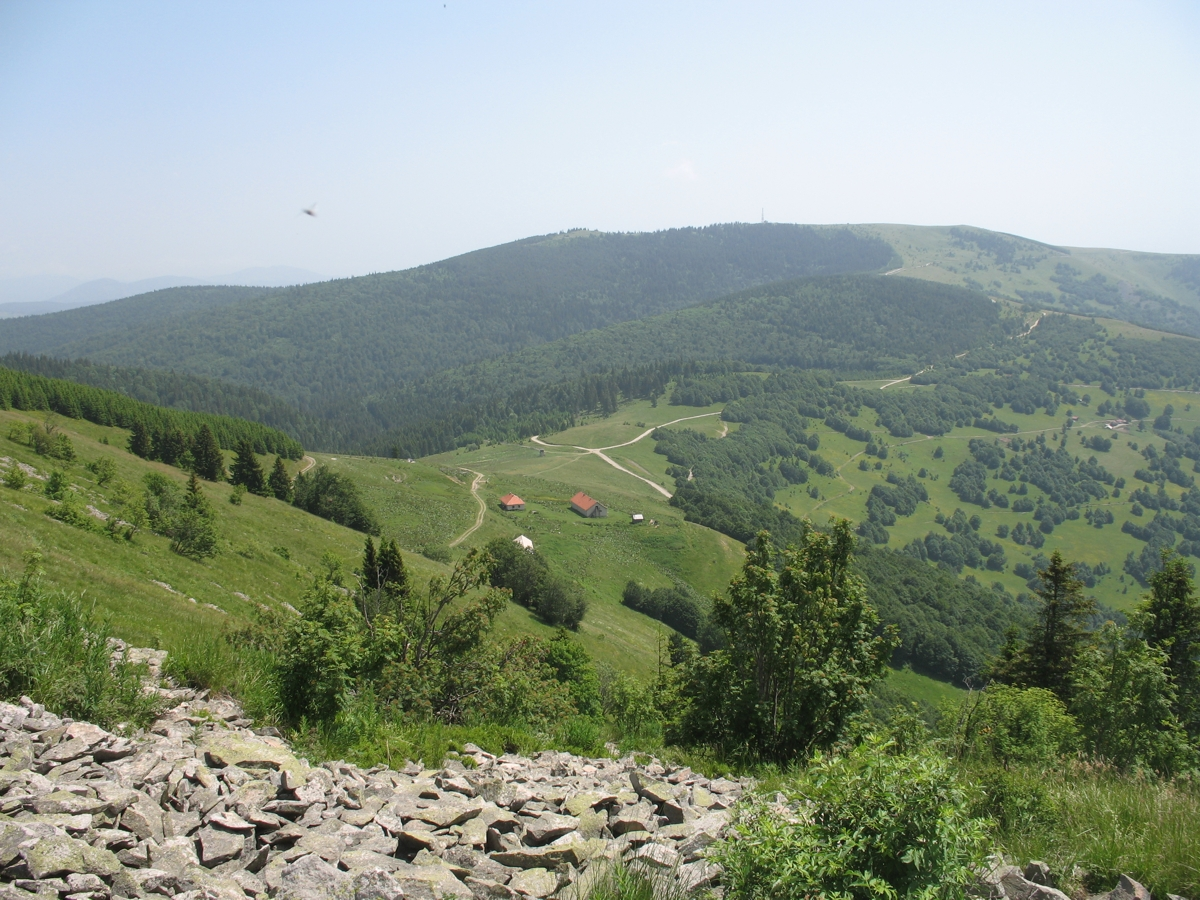
Golija

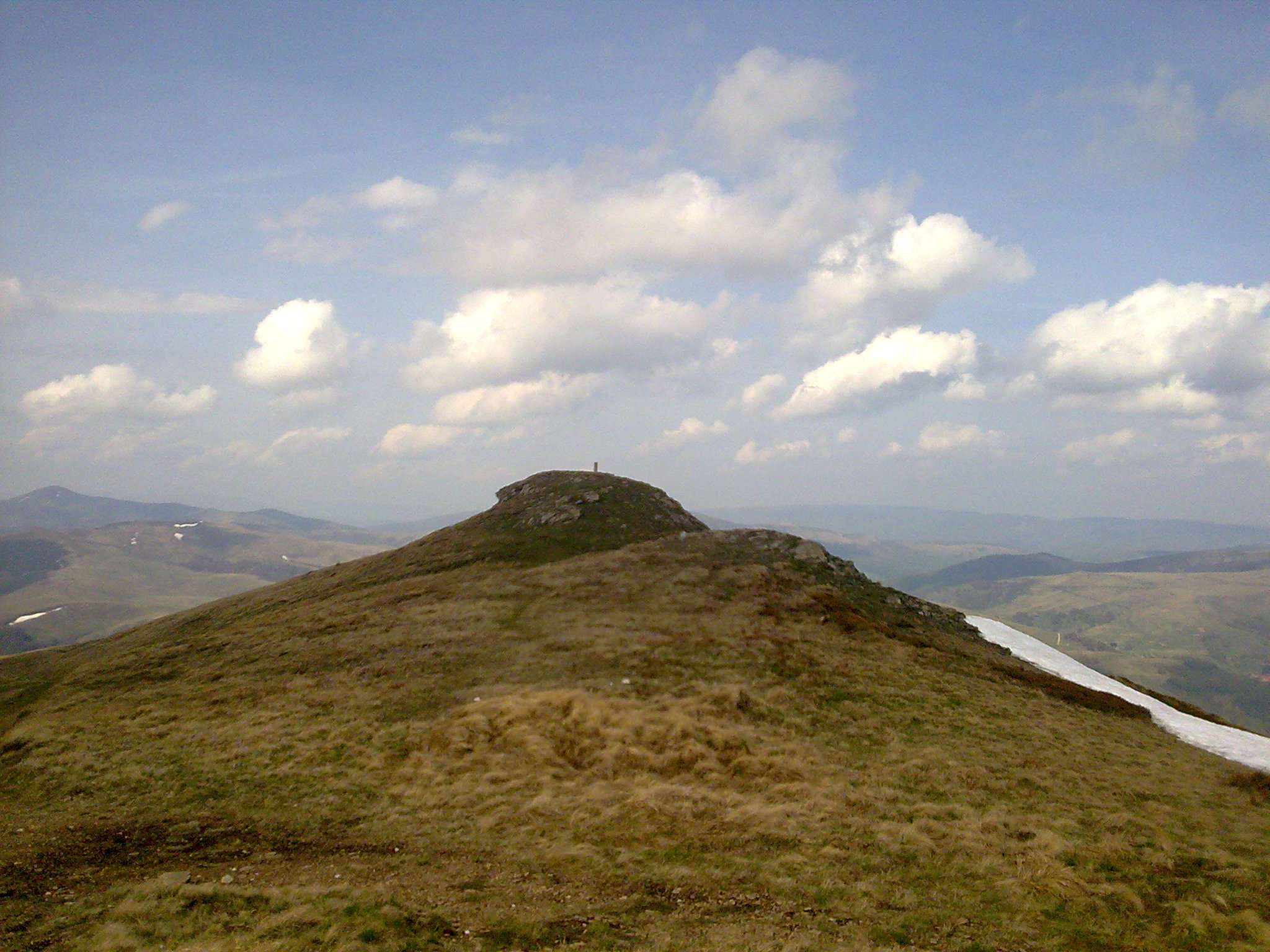
Besna Kobila peak

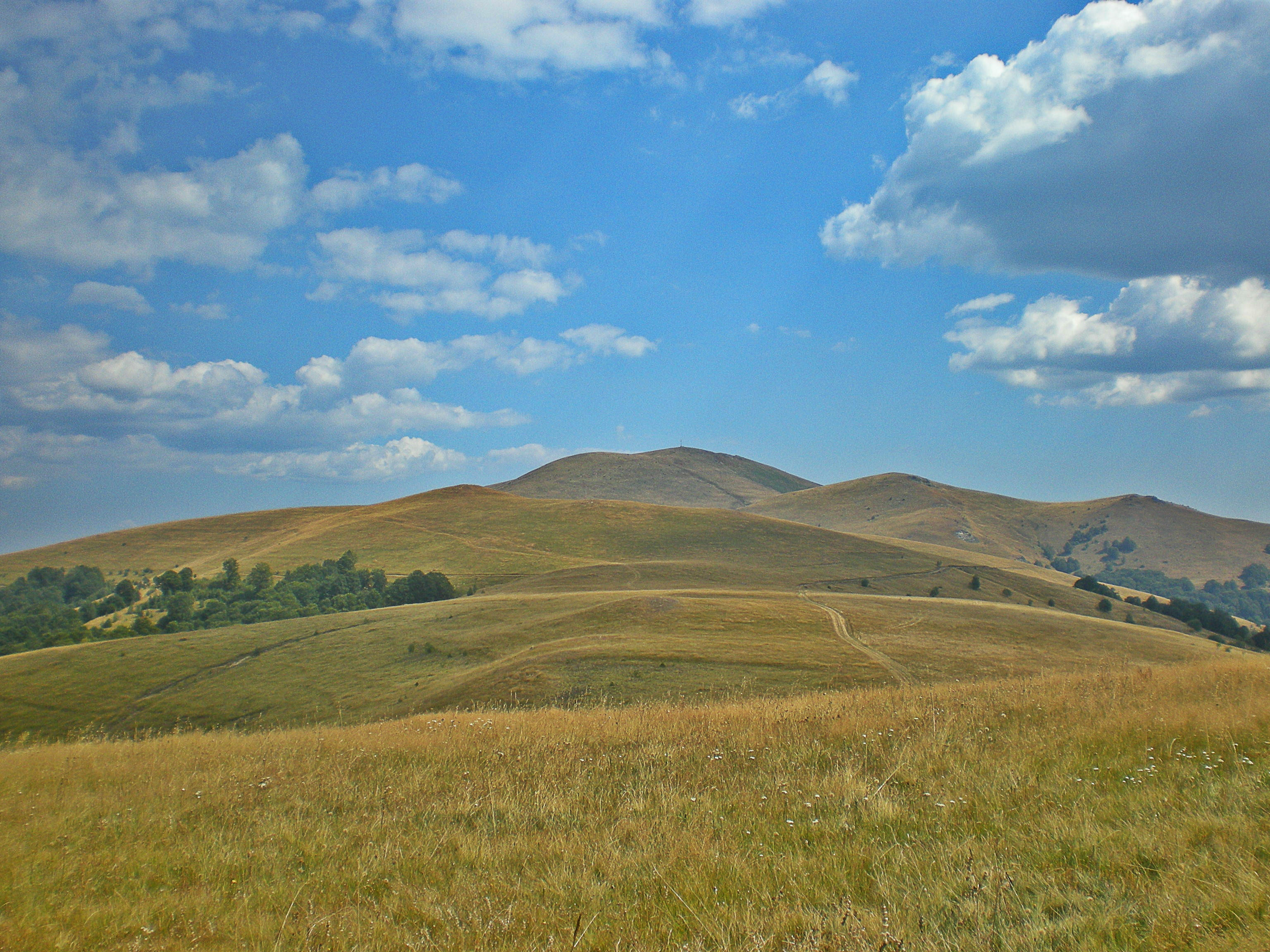
Dukat

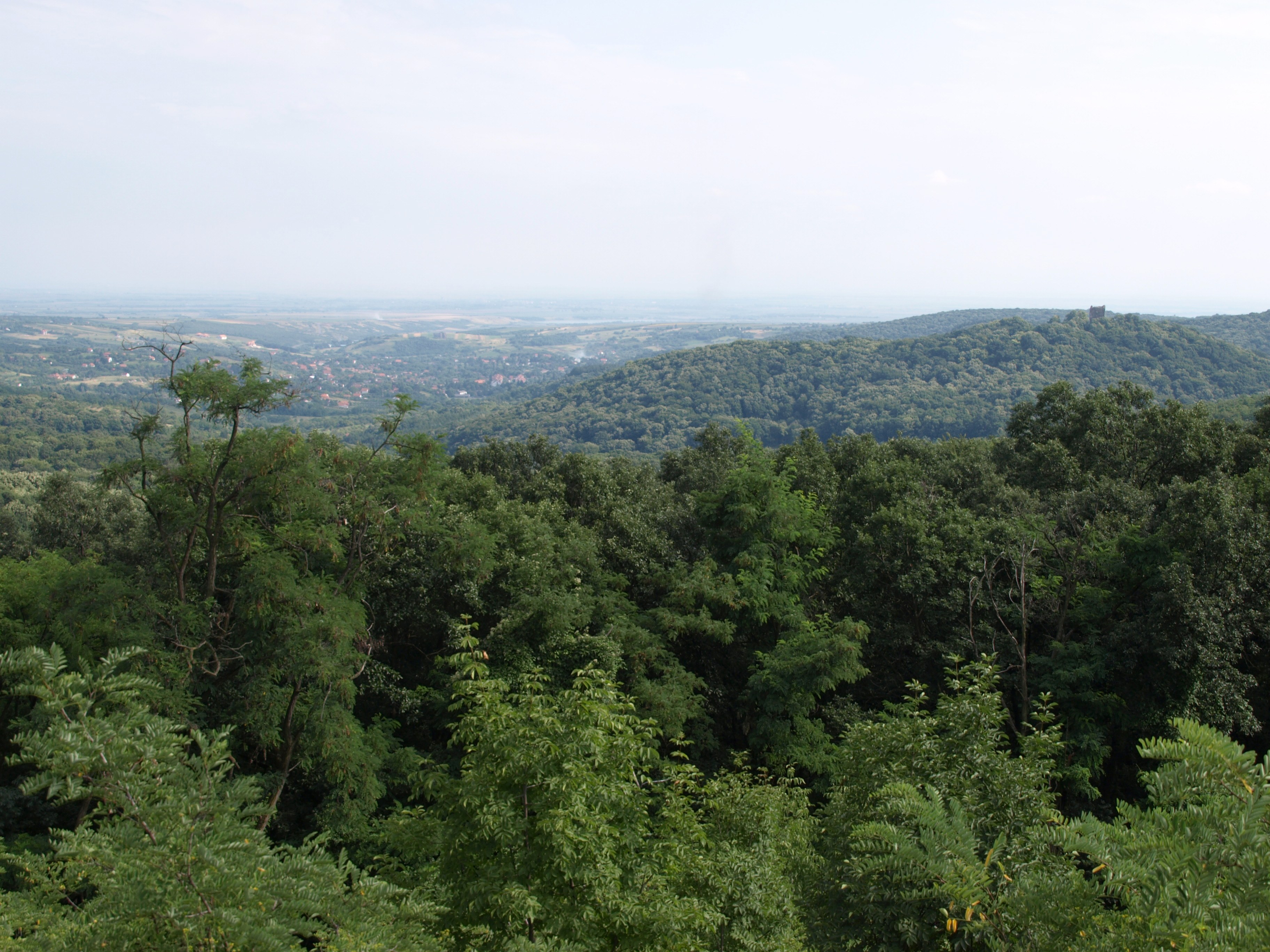
Fruška Gora

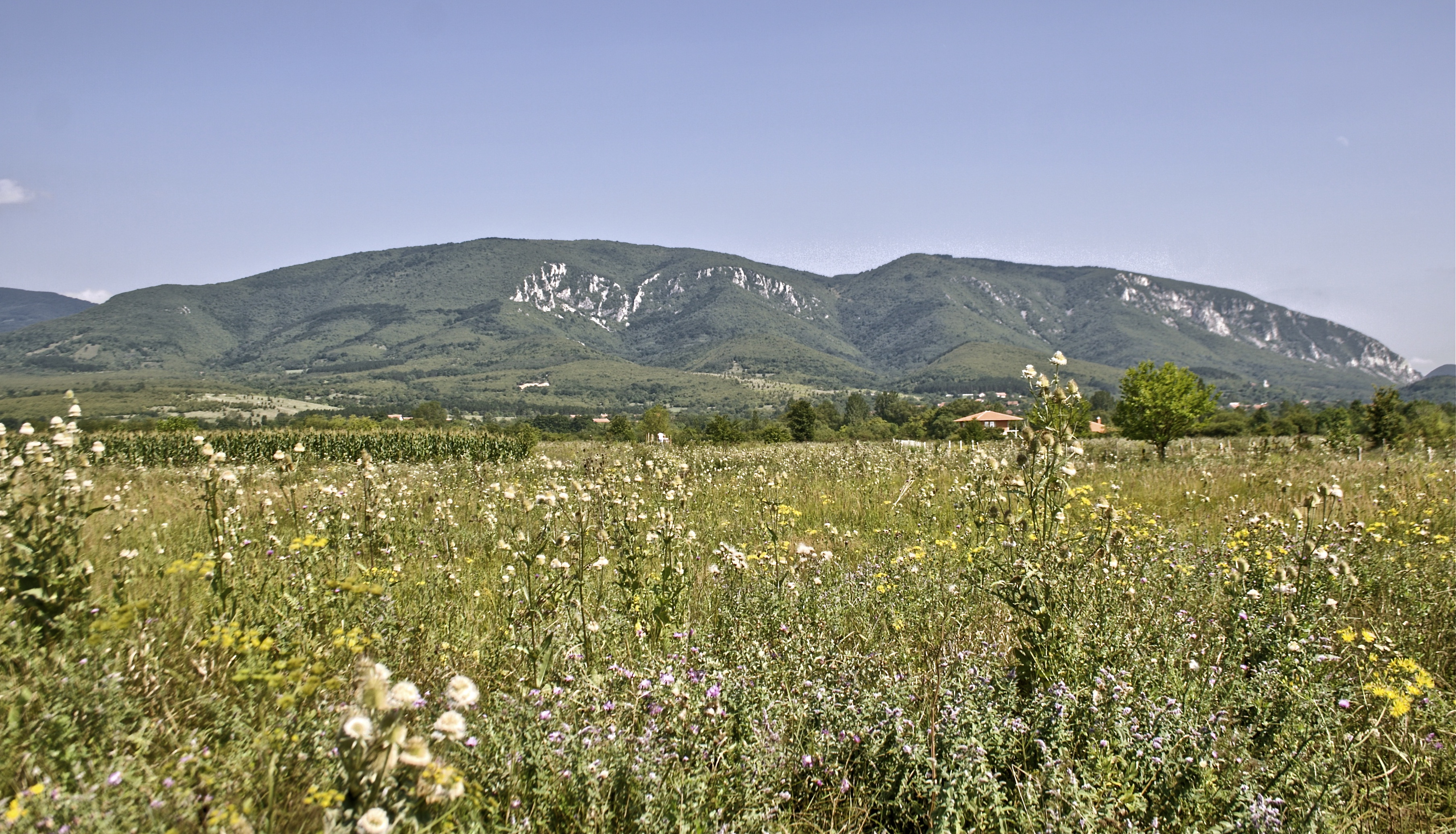
Homolje

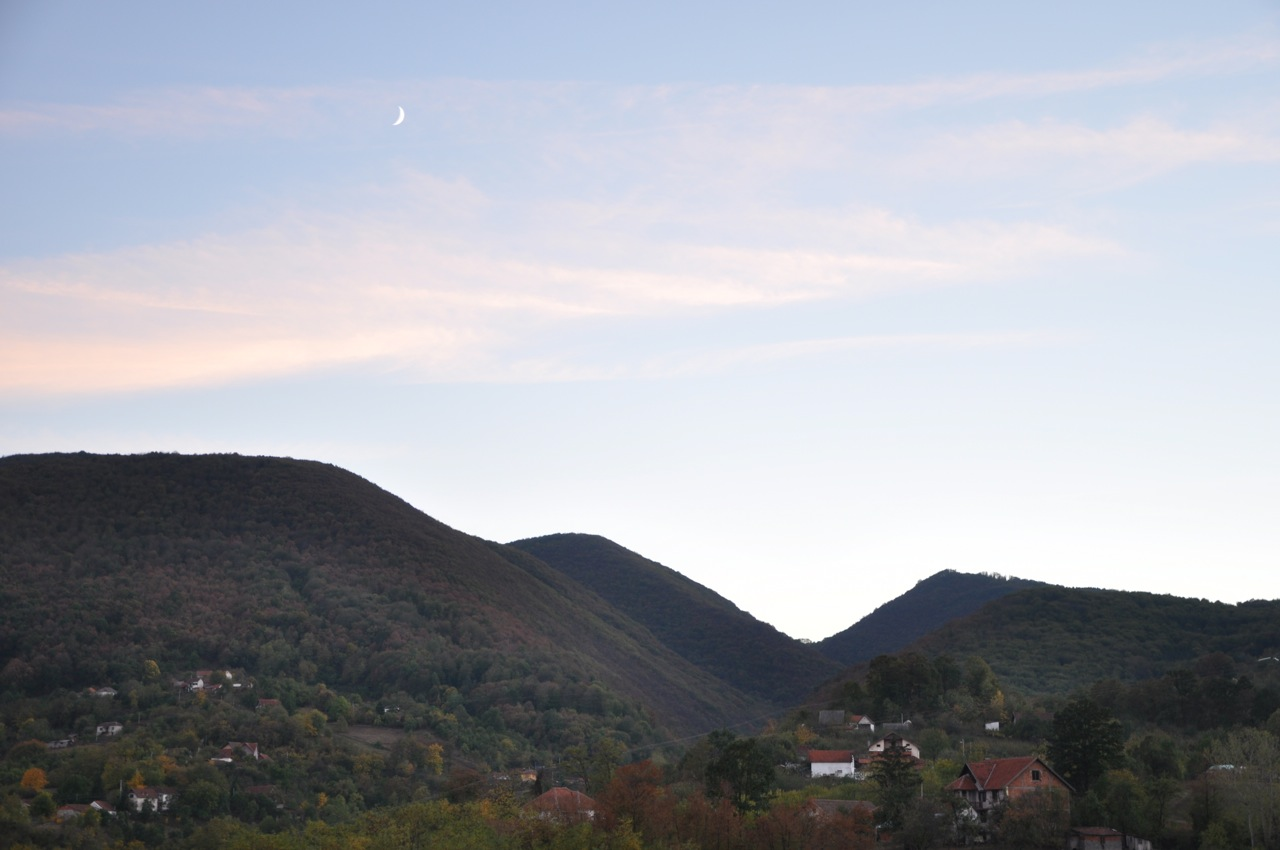
Jelica

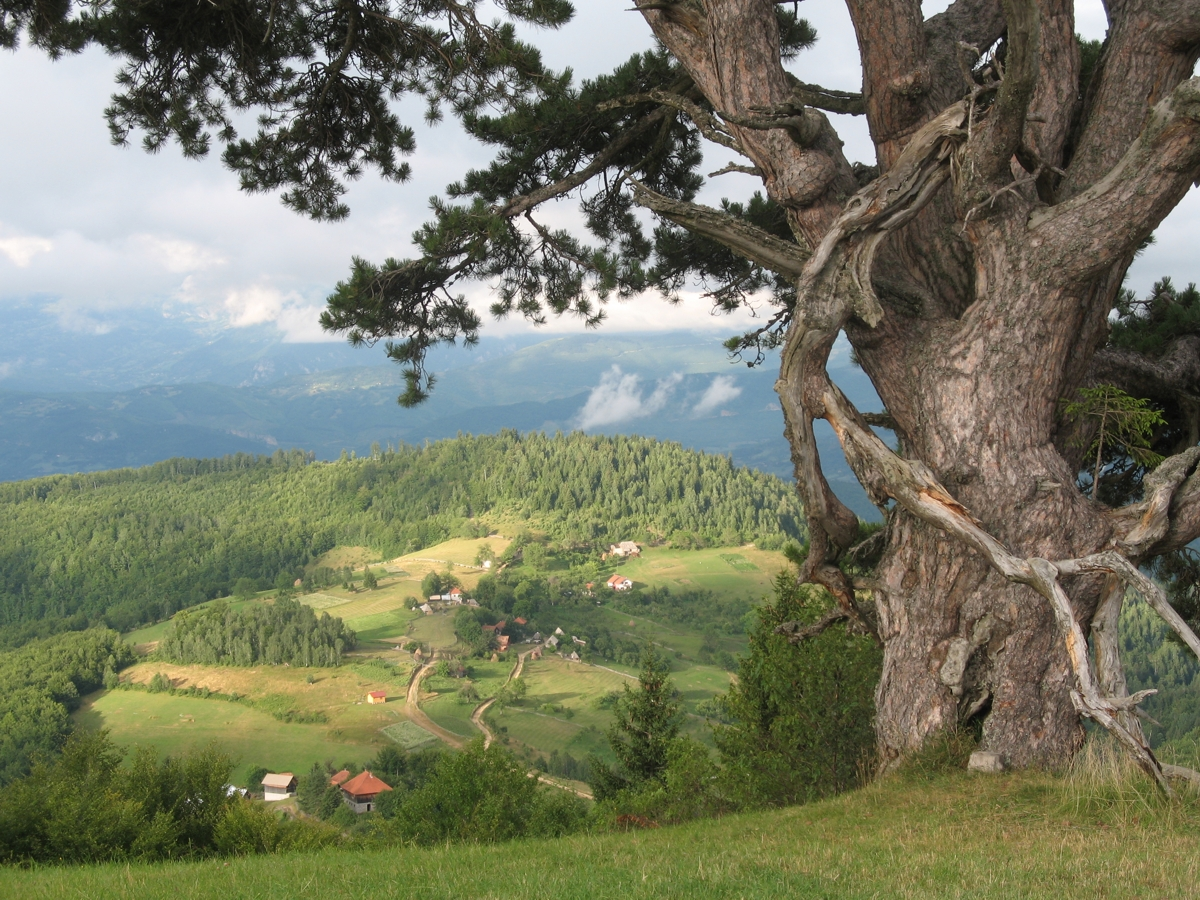
Kamena Gora

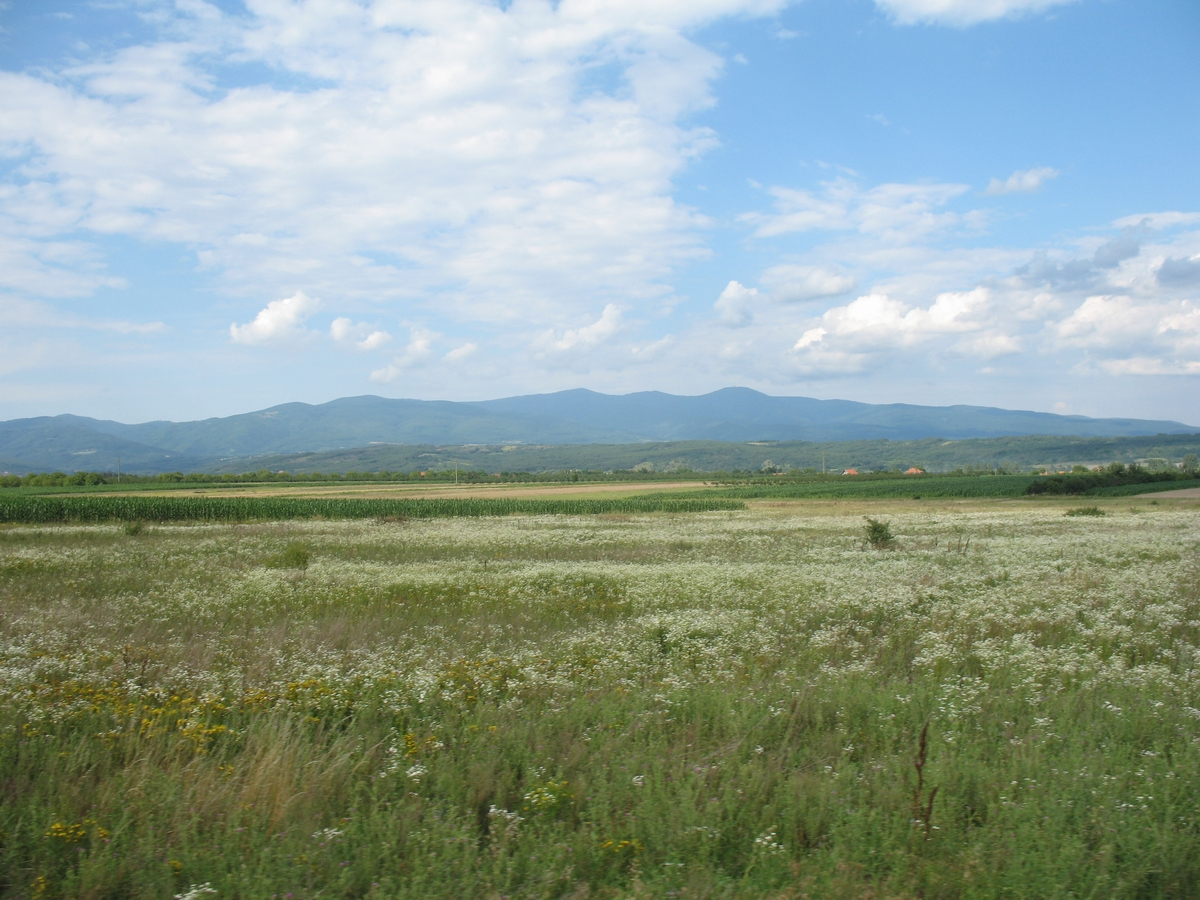
Jastrebac

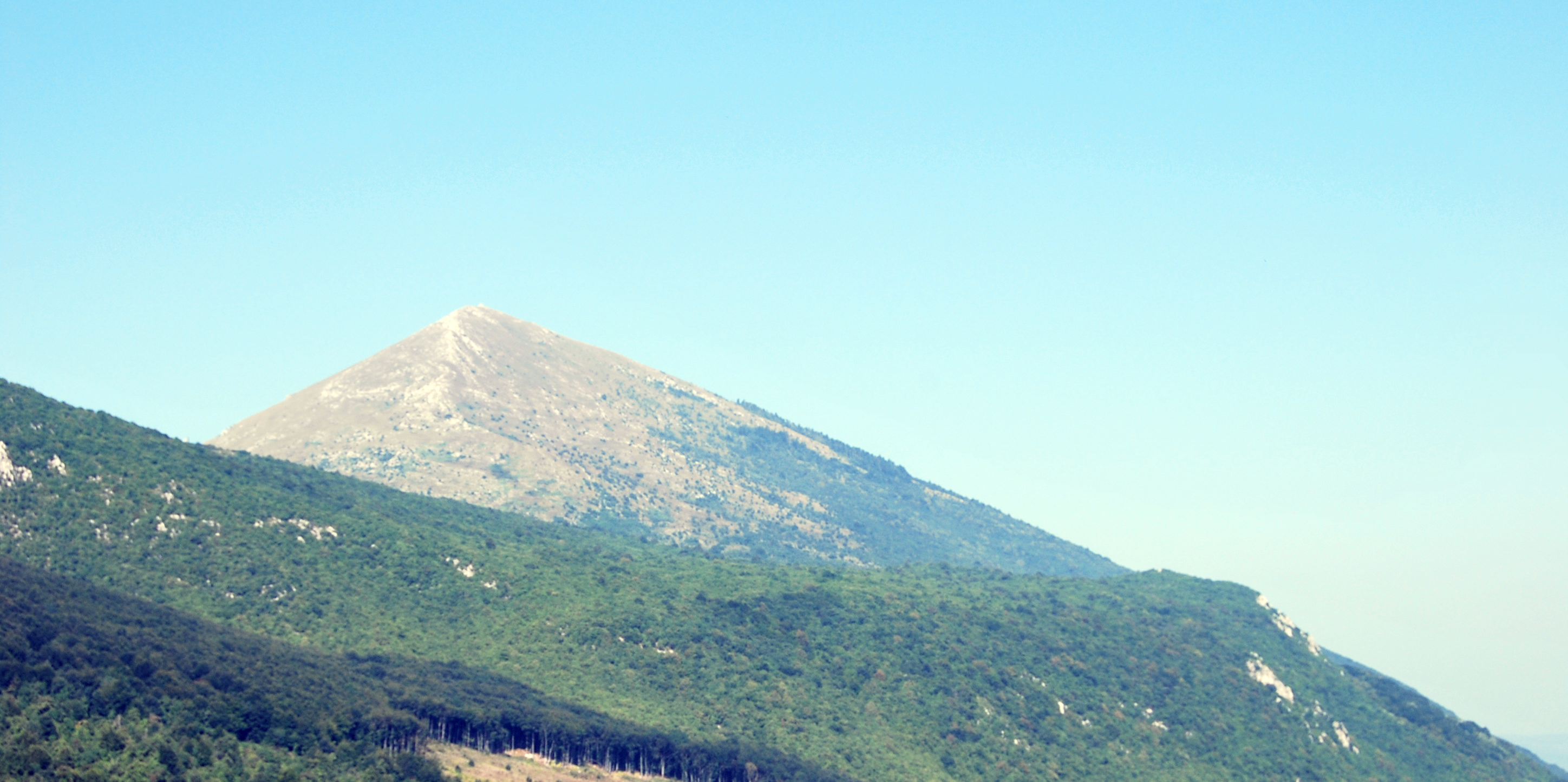
Rtanj

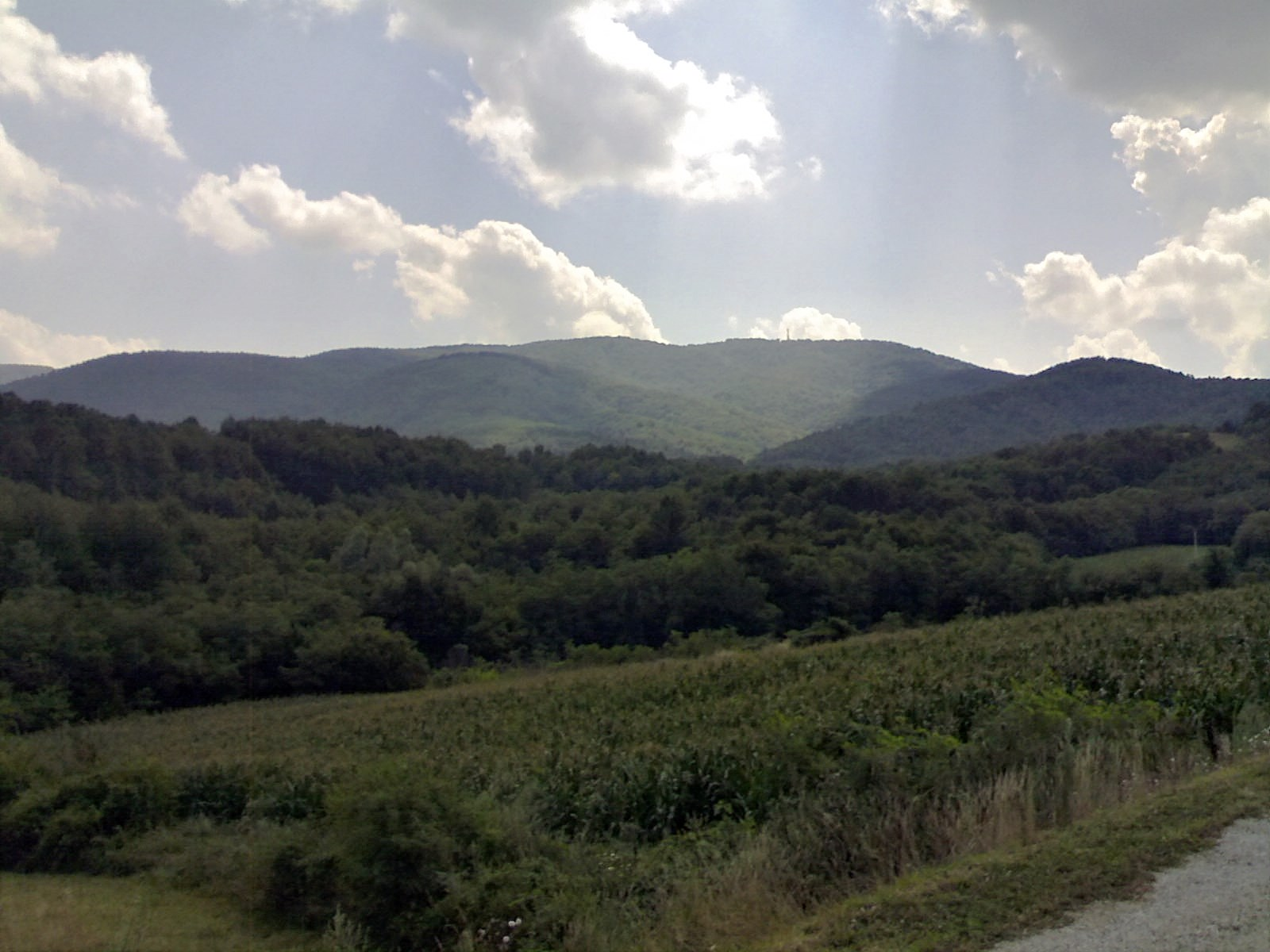
Cer

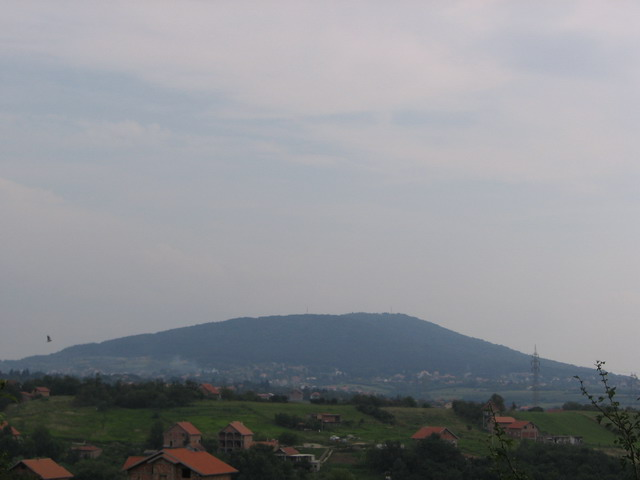
Avala

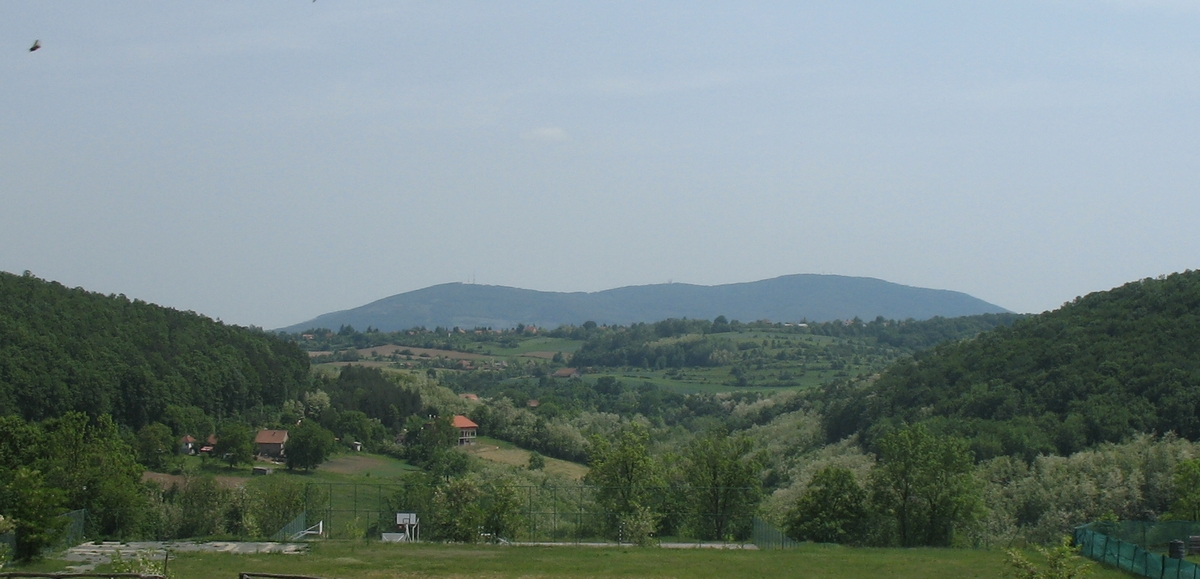
Kosmaj

Mountain	Highest peak(s)	Elevation (m)	Coordinates	Nearest town
Arbanaška planina	Vijogor	1128	43°02′44″N 21°27′40″E	Bojnik
Arbanaško brdo	.	607	43°05′44″N 21°25′34″E	Bojnik
Avala	.	511	44°41′20″N 20°30′58″E	Belgrade
Baba	.	657	43°50′13″N 21°33′06″E	Paraćin
Babička Gora	Kriva buka	1059	43°07′35″N 22°03′43″E	Leskovac
Banjsko brdo	.	1282	43°32′23″N 19°35′51″E	Priboj
Belava	Kardašica	946	43°11′38″N 22°28′37″E	Bela Palanka
Beljanica	Beljanica	1339	44°06′41″N 21°41′59″E	Žagubica
Besna Kobila	Šuplja padina	1862	42°30′20″N 22°14′9″E	Vranje
Besna Kobila	Besna kobila	1923	42°31′46″N 22°13′50″E	Vranje
Bešnjaja	Lisin laz	613	43°58′45″N 21°01′58″E	Kragujevac
Bić	Golet	1386	43°34′11″N 19°29′22″E	Priboj
Bitovik	.	1371	43°26′53″N 19°41′34″E	Prijepolje
Blagaja	Ravni krš	844	43°46′23″N 20°00′54″E	Požega
Bobija	Tornička Bobija	1272	44°11′46″N 19°33′16″E	Ljubovija
Boranja	Crni vrh	856	44°22′34″N 19°15′32″E	Krupanj
Bohovska planina	Ogorelica	1318	42°44′31″N 22°30′01″E	Bosilegrad
Bukulja	Bukulja	696	44°17′55″N 20°31′45″E	Aranđelovac
Bukovik	.	894	43°41′30″N 21°38′08″E	Ražanj
Bukovik	.	851	43°57′14″N 20°31′11″E	Gornji Milanovac
Cer	Cer	687	44°36′11″N 19°29′39″E	Šabac
Cer	.	593	44°37′17″N 19°25′46″E	Šabac
Crni Vrh (Jagodina)	Crni vrh	707	44°00′32″N 21°06′41″E	Jagodina
Crni Vrh (Bor)	Crni vrh	1043	44°07′50″N 21°57′51″E	Bor
Crni Vrh (Priboj)	Crni vrh	1188	43°35′15″N 19°35′48″E	Priboj
Crnokosa	Šarampov	809	43°58′03″N 19°54′59″E	Kosjerić
Crvena Gora	Opaljenička ćava	1215	43°32′07″N 20°08′36″E	Ivanjica
Čemernik	Vrlo osoje	1638	42°44′06″N 22°16′38″E	Surdulica
Čemernica	Čemernica	1495	43°31′16″N 19°59′10″E	Ivanjica
Čemerno	Smrdljuč	1579	43°34′57″N 20°25′33″E	Ivanjica
Čudinska planina	Aramlija	1496	42°22′07″N 22°27′56″E	Bosilegrad
Debela Gora	Branojevac	791	43°53′13″N 20°10′00″E	Lučani
Debelo Brdo	Vinčine vode	1094	44°09′01″N 19°41′28″E	Valjevo
Deli Jovan	Crni vrh	1141	44°13′15″N 22°13′02″E	Negotin
Devica	Čapljinac	1187	43°35′38″N 21°56′39″E	Sokobanja
Drežnička Gradina	.	932	43°47′02″N 19°56′14″E	Požega
Drmanovina	Grad	1022	43°58′52″N 19°49′53″E	Kosjerić
Dukat	Crnook	1881	42°25′31″N 22°23′26″E	Bosilegrad
Fruška Gora	Crveni čot	539	45°09′07″N 19°42′48″E	Beočin
Fruška Gora	Iriški venac	516	45°09′32″N 19°52′04″E	Irig
Gajeva planina	Veliki Tmor	1280	43°35′25″N 19°19′56″E	Priboj
Gradina	Bandjer	1446	43°25′37″N 19°20′29″E	Priboj
Giljeva	Jelenak	1617	43°10′45″N 19°54′24″E	Sjenica
Gledić Mountains	Crni vrh	895	43°51′42″N 20°54′21″E	Kragujevac
Gledić Mountains	Samar	922	43°45′03″N 20°57′03″E	Trstenik
Gloška planina	Mečit	1756	42°31′41″N 22°22′32″E	Bosilegrad
Goč	Ljukten	1216	43°32′11″N 20°50′44″E	Vrnjačka Banja
Golaš		1389	43°12′13″N 22°14′45″E	Bela Palanka
Golija	Crni vrh	1795	43°18′44″N 20°23′27″E	Raška
Golija	Jankov kamen	1833	43°20′16″N 20°16′36″E	Ivanjica
Golubac	Stanojev vrh	733	43°44′11″N 20°11′53″E	Guča
Goljak	Novakova	1101	42°43′43″N 21°32′31″E	Sijarinska Banja
Goljak	Velja glava	1181	42°41′30″N 21°41′21″E	Sijarinska Banja
Golemi Stol	.	1238	43°01′43″N 22°29′42″E	Babušnica
Goli Krš	.	887	44°08′05″N 22°10′13″E	Bor
Gramada	Vrtop	1721	42°47′33″N 22°22′20″E	Surdulica
Greben	Beženište	1338	42°56′54″N 22°38′29″E	Dimitrovgrad
Grot	Grot	1327	42°37′30″N 21°54′30″E	Vranje
Gučevo	Crni vrh	779	44°28′50″N 19°11′04″E	Loznica
Homolje Mountains	Veliki Vukan	825	44°17′57″N 21°32′14″E	Petrovac na Mlavi
Homolje Mountains	Vranj	884	44°19′57″N 21°36′53″E	Petrovac na Mlavi
Homolje Mountains	Štubej	940	44°21′31″N 21°37′46″E	Petrovac na Mlavi
Hum	Krstača	1756	42°57′51″N 20°07′16″E	Sjenica
Jablanik	Jablanik	1275	44°10′35″N 19°40′00″E	Valjevo
Jabuka	Slatina	1412	43°21′58″N 19°27′16″E	Prijepolje
Jadovnik	Katunić	1734	43°16′36″N 19°50′00″E	Prijepolje
Jagodnja	Košutnja Stopa	939	44°20′39″N 19°17′37″E	Krupanj
Jarut	Markov vrh	1428	43°03′54″N 20°14′42″E	Tutin
Jastrebac	Velika Đulica	1492	43°23′31″N 21°26′57″E	Kruševac
Javor	Vasilin vrh	1519	43°26′29″N 20°03′16″E	Ivanjica
Javorište	Oštri kamen	1213	44°01′57″N 21°47′29″E	Resavica
Javorje	Ober	1486	43°32′32″N 19°17′43″E	Priboj
Jelica	Crna Stena	929	43°47′34″N 20°21′36″E	Čačak
Jelova gora	Jelenina glava	1011	43°56′59″N 19°46′27″E	Bajina Bašta
Ješevac	Crni vrh	902	44°00′17″N 20°33′12″E	Gornji Milanovac
Ježevac	.	675	44°15′53″N 21°31′02″E	Petrovac na Mlavi
Juhor	Veliki Vetren	774	43°48′44″N 21°15′51″E	Paraćin
Kamena Gora	Ravna gora	1496	43°18′12″N 19°32′27″E	Prijepolje
Kablar	Kablar	889	43°54′48″N 20°11′05″E	Čačak
Kopaonik	Pančić's Peak	2017	43°16′05″N 20°49′35″E	Raška
Kosmaj	Kosmaj	626	44°27′56″N 20°33′56″E	Mladenovac
Kotlenik	Veliki vrh	749	43°50′35″N 20°40′43″E	Kraljevo
Kozjak	Virovi	1284	42°18′37″N 21°55′42″E	Bujanovac
Kozomor	Veliki Kozomor	1007	44°05′27″N 19°56′41″E	Kosjerić
Kravarska planina	Kravarska glava	1002	42°56′26″N 21°20′23″E	Kuršumlija
Krstac	Lis	699	43°47′39″N 20°11′38″E	Guča
Kruševica	Vita kruška	913	43°02′22″N 22°10′38″E	Vlasotince
Kučaj	Velika Tresta	1284	44°05′10″N 21°49′25″E	Zlot
Kučaj	Koprivno brdo	1063	43°56′26″N 21°43′58″E	Senjski Rudnik
Kučaj	Pozerak	1049	44°02′11″N 21°39′46″E	Resavica
Kukavica	Vlajna	1442	42°47′29″N 21°56′47″E	Vladičin Han
Kukutnica	.	1382	43°35′58″N 20°01′59″E	Arilje
Lepa Gora	Crna čuka	1196	43°14′48″N 21°07′20″E	Kuršumlija
Liškovac	Veliki Liškovac	803	44°27′09″N 22°01′17″E	Majdanpek
Lisinska planina	Valozi	1829	42°32′57″N 22°18′43″E	Bosilegrad
Magleš	Pali	1036	44°08′54″N 19°50′28″E	Valjevo
Mali Krš	Garvan	929	44°17′08″N 22°00′58″E	Majdanpek
Majdan	Vratnica Jokovića	1096	42°55′36″N 21°27′26″E	Medveđa
Malič	.	1110	43°38′56″N 20°06′11″E	Ivanjica
Malinik	Veliki Malinik	1158	43°59′30″N 21°54′44″E	Zlot
Malinik	Mali Malinik	1019	43°59′09″N 21°54′19″E	Zlot
Maljen	Crni vrh	1096	44°05′46″N 19°59′51″E	Valjevo
Maljen	Kraljev sto	1104	44°07′08″N 20°01′22″E	Valjevo
Medvednik	.	1247	44°12′37″N 19°38′12″E	Valjevo
Miloslavska planina	Golema rudina	1486	42°49′30″N 22°26′23″E	Dimitrovgrad
Milevska planina	Krvavi kamik	1738	42°33′54″N 22°26′22″E	Bosilegrad
Miroč	Štrbac	768	44°35′31″N 22°16′45″E	Donji Milanovac
Miroč	.	560	44°40′38″N 22°25′40″E	Tekija
Mokra Gora	Smailova kula	1947	42°50′00″N 20°26′50″E	Tutin
Mokra Gora	Pogled	2156	42°49′54″N 20°22′03″E	Tutin
Mokra Gora	Strašnik	1942	42°51′58″N 20°33′09″E	Tutin
Mučanj	Jerinin grad	1534	43°32′42″N 20°02′04″E	Ivanjica
Murtenica	Brijač	1480	43°35′23″N 19°47′32″E	Nova Varoš
Nemić	.	797	44°10′43″N 19°26′03″E	Ljubovija
Ninaja	Homar	1462	43°10′08″N 20°13′19″E	Novi Pazar
Oblik	Oblik	1310	42°38′35″N 21°55′07″E	Vranje
Ovčar	.	985	43°53′48″N 20°12′50″E	Čačak
Orovica	.	856	43°55′34″N 20°07′11″E	Lučani
Oštrik	Veliki Oštrik	1283	43°30′13″N 19°39′21″E	Priboj
Ostrica	.	802	43°56′03″N 20°31′54″E	Gornji Milanovac
Ostrozub	Ostrozupska čuka	1546	42°52′56″N 22°14′51″E	Crna Trava
Ozren (Pešter)	Orlovača	1693	43°14′42″N 19°50′47″E	Sjenica
Ozren (Pešter)	Kamarišta	1641	43°13′47″N 19°50′36″E	Sjenica
Ozren (Sokobanja)	Leskovik	1174	43°35′02″N 21°50′41″E	Sokobanja
Pasjača	.	971	43°09′54″N 21°37′19″E	Žitorađa
Pešter	Kuljarski vrh	1492	43°03′04″N 20°03′21″E	Sjenica
Pljačkovica	Pljačkovica	1231	42°35′26″N 21°53′59″E	Vranje
Pobijenik	Borak	1423	43°28′45″N 19°32′48″E	Priboj
Povlen	Mali Povlen	1347	44°07′49″N 19°44′31″E	Valjevo
Projić	.	1256	43°29′33″N 19°22′47″E	Priboj
Radan	Šopot	1408	43°00′12″N 21°29′48″E	Kuršumlija
Radočelo	Krivača	1643	43°28′27″N 20°28′21″E	Baljevac
Ravna planina	Crni vrh	1542	43°31′21″N 20°46′46″E	Vrnjačka Banja
Rgajska planina	.	1017	43°07′14″N 21°31′59″E	Prokuplje
Rogozna	Crni vrh	1479	43°00′52″N 20°34′48″E	Novi Pazar
Rožanj (Ražanj)	Veliki vrh	897	43°43′02″N 21°41′37″E	Ražanj
Rožanj (Gornji Milanovac)	Kobiljača	601	43°59′26″N 20°20′38″E	Gornji Milanovac
Rtanj	Šiljak	1565	43°46′34″N 21°53′36″E	Sokobanja
Rudnik	Cvijićev vrh	1132	44°07′53″N 20°32′25″E	Gornji Milanovac
Ruy	Crni vrh	1463	42°55′06″N 22°29′47″E	Babušnica
Ruy	Ruj	1706	42°51′46″N 22°34′32″E	Babušnica
Rujan	Kalje	968	42°21′58″N 21°49′06″E	Bujanovac
Samanjac	.	853	43°47′41″N 21°40′51″E	Boljevac
Seličevica	Velika Tumba	903	43°14′10″N 21°58′12″E	Niš
Slemen	.	1099	43°41′23″N 22°03′17″E	Knjaževac
Sokolovica	Sokolovac	1260	43°02′00″N 21°28′41″E	Prolom Banja
Sokolska planina	Rožanj	973	44°16′58″N 19°27′35″E	Krupanj
Stara planina	Midžor	2169	43°23′42″N 22°40′57″E	Pirot
Stara planina	Dupljak	2032	43°25′34″N 22°39′40″E	Knjaževac
Stojkovačka planina	.	1360	43°32′04″N 20°22′20″E	Ivanjica
Stol	.	1156	44°10′38″N 22°08′21″E	Bor
Stolovi	Čiker	1375	43°36′32″N 20°36′40″E	Kraljevo
Studena planina	Kavgalija	1355	43°31′32″N 20°40′48″E	Kraljevo
Šljivovik	Šljivovički vrh	1258	43°09′50″N 22°21′21″E	Bela Palanka
Subjel	Subjel	924	44°00′52″N 19°58′59″E	Kosjerić
Suva Planina	Trem	1810	43°10′57″N 22°10′16″E	Gadžin Han
Suva Planina	Golaš	1456	43°10′54″N 22°14′48″E	Bela Palanka
Suva Planina	Golemo Stražište	1713	43°08′38″N 22°12′54″E	Bela Palanka
Suvobor	Rajac	847	44°08′13″N 20°13′17″E	Gornji Milanovac
Suvobor	Suvobor	866	44°07′16″N 20°10′54″E	Gornji Milanovac
Svrljig Mountains	Pleš	1267	43°21′14″N 22°09′52″E	Niška Banja
Svrljig Mountains	Zeleni vrh	1334	43°19′50″N 22°15′09″E	Svrljig
Široka planina	Kopljača	1345	42°19′27″N 22°02′02″E	Trgovište
Šomrda	.	803	44°32′23″N 21°58′58″E	Lepenski Vir
Sveti Ilija	.	1271	42°34′23″N 21°48′15″E	Vranje
Tara	Zborište	1544	43°50′54″N 19°27′34″E	Bajina Bašta
Tilva Njagra	.	770	44°04′25″N 21°59′48″E	Zlot
Tresibaba	Čukar	826	43°26′10″N 22°21′21″E	Svrljig
Troglav	Kom	1178	43°38′26″N 20°29′11″E	Kraljevo
Tupižnica	Bučanski kamen	1160	43°42′11″N 22°09′06″E	Boljevac
Tupižnica	Glogovački vrh	1162	43°43′44″N 22°09′42″E	Boljevac
Vardenik	Veliki Strešer	1875	42°37′36″N 22°16′02″E	Surdulica
Vidlič	Golemi vrh	1413	43°08′10″N 22°49′05″E	Pirot
Vlaška planina	Panica	1443	42°59′12″N 22°35′16″E	Dimitrovgrad
Veliki Greben	Crni vrh	656	44°21′18″N 22°14′45″E	Donji Milanovac
Veliki Krš	Veliki krš	1148	44°10′15″N 22°05′16″E	Bor
Venčac	.	659	44°15′45″N 20°35′34″E	Aranđelovac
Vidojevica	Bandera	1155	43°08′29″N 21°33′21″E	Prokuplje
Vlašić	.	463	44°28′01″N 19°34′55″E	Osečina
Vlašić	.	474	44°22′45″N 19°48′22″E	Osečina
Vršac mountains	Gudurički vrh	641	45°08′14″N 21°24′44″E	Vršac
Vujan	Veliki Vujan	856	43°58′20″N 20°28′09″E	Gornji Milanovac
Zladovska planina	Zelenčev vrh	1574	42°25′20″N 22°06′35″E	Trgovište
Zlatar	Golo brdo	1627	43°24′32″N 19°47′33″E	Nova Varoš
Zlatibor	Čigota	1422	43°38′53″N 19°46′41″E	Čajetina
Zlatibor	Tornik	1496	43°39′15″N 19°38′39″E	Čajetina
Zvijezda	Kozji rid	1591	43°54′24″N 19°18′18″E	Bajina Bašta
Žilindar	Žilindar	1616	43°02′34″N 20°00′18″E	Sjenica
Željin	Željin	1785	43°28′44″N 20°48′18″E	Vrnjačka Banja

== Peaks over 2,000 meters ==
2000+ peaks of Serbia

The following lists only those mountain peaks which reach over 2,000 meters in height.

Peak	Mountain	Height (m)
Midžor	Stara planina	2,169
Pogled	Mokra Gora	2,156
Dupljak	Stara planina	2,032
Pančić's Peak	Kopaonik	2,017

== See also ==
- Geography of Serbia
- List of rivers in Serbia
- List of lakes in Serbia
- List of hills in Belgrade
- Dinaric Alps
