= Malinik =

Mountain in Serbia

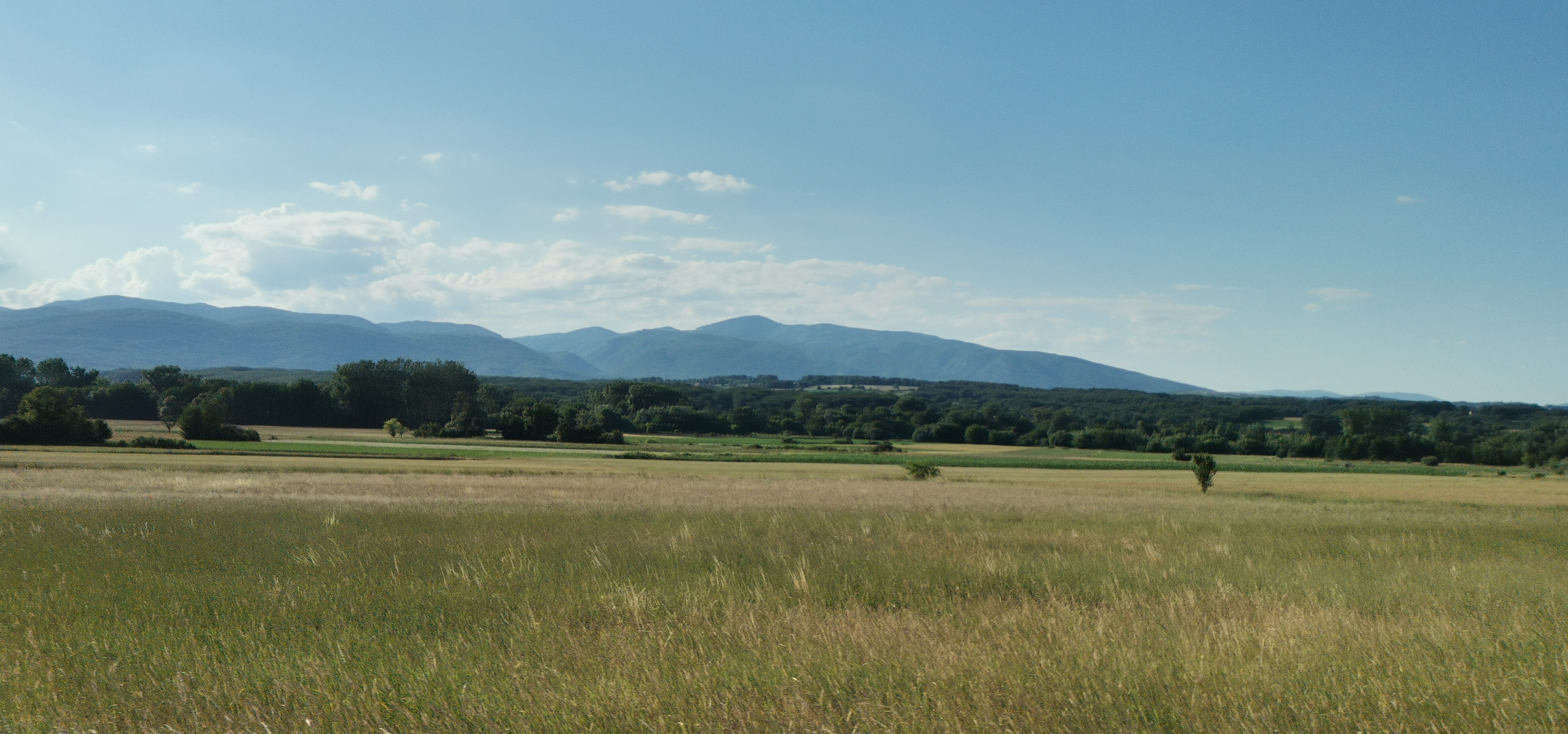

Highest point
- Elevation: 1,158 m (3,799 ft)
- Coordinates: 43°59′30″N 21°54′44″E

Geography
- Location within Serbia
- Location: Eastern Serbia
- Parent range: Carpathian Mountains

Malinik (Serbian Cyrillic: Малиник) is a mountain in eastern Serbia. Its highest peak, Veliki Malinik, has an elevation of 1,158 metres above sea level. Smaller peak, Mali Malinik, is 1019 m.

The most prominent features of Malinik are the spectacular Lazar's Canyon of the eponymous river, carved almost vertically in the mountain's karst masif; and Lazar Cave near the village of Zlot.

== See also ==
- List of mountains in Serbia
