= Studena planina =

Mountain in Serbia

- Location within Serbia

Highest point
- Elevation: 1,355 m (4,446 ft)
- Coordinates: 43°31′32″N 20°40′48″E

Geography
- Location: Southwestern Serbia
- Parent range: Dinaric Alps

Studena planina (Serbian Cyrillic: Студена планина) is a mountain in central Serbia, near the city of Kraljevo. Its highest peak, Kavgalija, has an elevation of 1,355 meters above sea level. It stretches from west to east from the Ibar Valley towards the mountain of Goč, forming a continuous ridge with Ravna planina.

== See also ==
- List of mountains in Serbia
