= Pobijenik =

Mountain in Serbia

- Location within Serbia

Highest point
- Elevation: 1,423 m (4,669 ft)
- Coordinates: 43°28′45″N 19°32′48″E

Geography
- Location: Western Serbia
- Parent range: Dinaric Alps

Pobijenik (Serbian Cyrillic: Побијеник) is a mountain in western Serbia, between cities of Prijepolje and Priboj. Its highest peak, Borak, has an elevation of 1,423 meters above sea level.

== See also ==
- List of mountains in Serbia
