= Ježevac (mountain) =

Mountain in Serbia

- Location within Serbia

Highest point
- Elevation: 675 m (2,215 ft)
- Coordinates: 44°15′53″N 21°31′02″E

Geography
- Location: Eastern Serbia
- Parent range: Carpathian Mountains

Ježevac (Serbian Cyrillic: Јежевац) is a mountain in eastern Serbia, near the town of Petrovac na Mlavi. Its highest peak has an elevation of 675 meters above sea level. Ježevac sharply rises over the southern edge of Mlava river gorge, entering the Homolje region. On the mountain, there is Gornjak Monastery carved into limestone rocks.

== See also ==
- List of mountains in Serbia
