= Sveti Ilija (Serbia) =

Mountain in Serbia

- Location within Serbia

Highest point
- Elevation: 1,271 m (4,170 ft)
- Coordinates: 42°34′23″N 21°48′15″E

Geography
- Location: Southern Serbia
- Parent range: Dinaric Alps

Sveti Ilija (Serbian Cyrillic: Свети Илија) is a mountain in southern Serbia, above the city of Vranje. Its highest peak has an elevation of 1,271 meters (4,170 feet) above sea level.

== See also ==
- List of mountains in Serbia
