= Babička Gora =

Mountain in Serbia

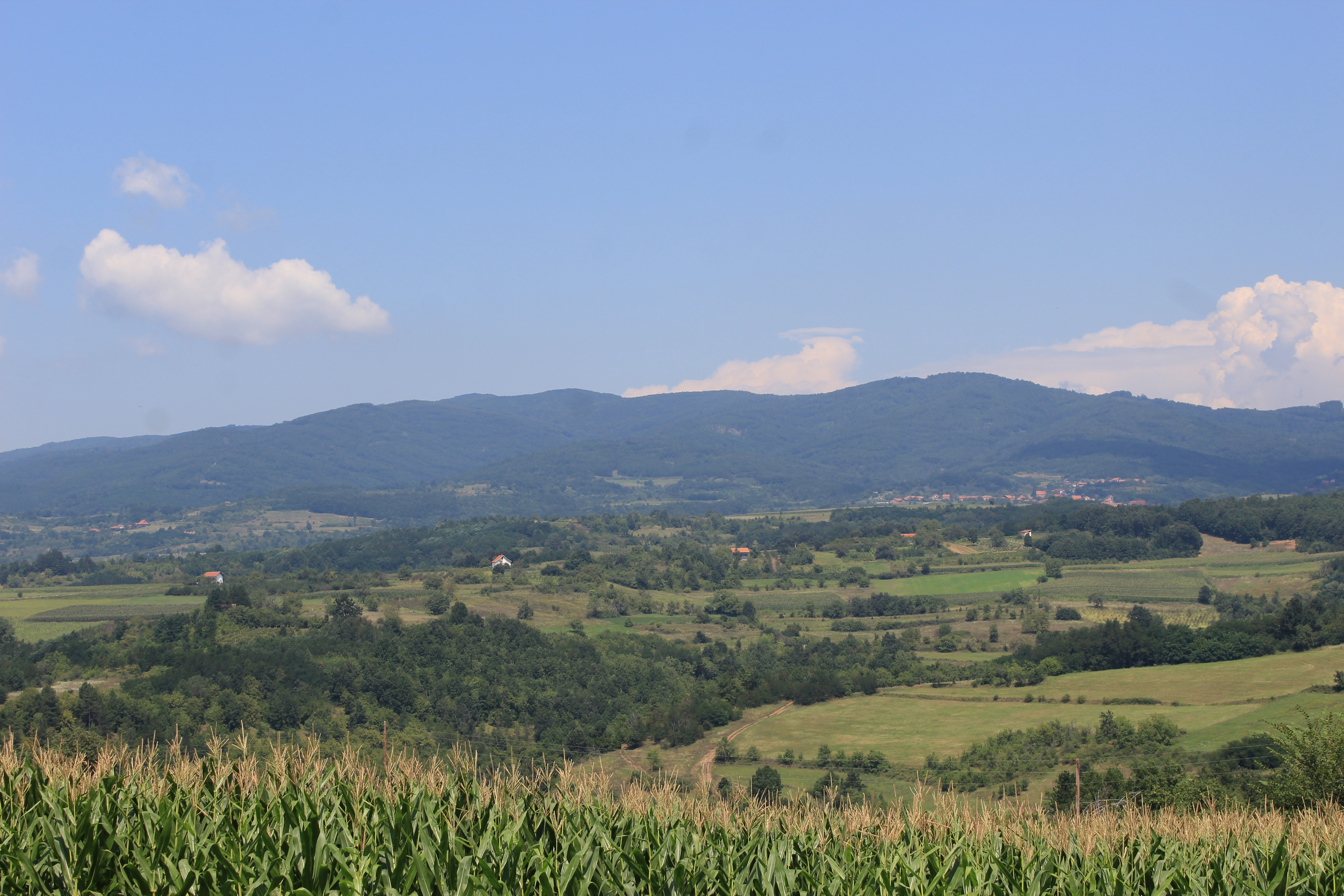
- View of Babička Gora

Highest point
- Elevation: 1,059 m (3,474 ft)
- Coordinates: 43°07′35″N 22°03′43″E

Geography
- Location within Serbia
- Location: Southern Serbia
- Parent range: Balkan Mountains

Babička gora (Serbian Cyrillic: Бабичка гора) is a mountain in southern Serbia, near the city of Leskovac. Its highest peak, Kriva buka (Крива бука), rises 1,059 meters above sea level.

== See also ==
- List of mountains in Serbia
