= Gajeva planina =

Mountain in Serbia

- Location within Serbia Location within Bosnia and Herzegovina

Highest point
- Elevation: 1,280 m (4,200 ft)
- Coordinates: 43°35′26″N 19°19′56″E

Geography
- Location: Serbia / Bosnia and Herzegovina
- Parent range: Dinaric Alps

Gajeva planina (Serbian Cyrillic: Гајева планина) is a mountain on the border of Serbia and Bosnia and Herzegovina, between towns of Priboj and Rudo. Its highest peak Veliki Tmor has an elevation of 1,280 m (4,199 ft) above sea level.

== See also ==
- List of mountains in Serbia
