= Čemernica (Serbia) =

Mountain in Serbia

- Location within Serbia

Highest point
- Elevation: 1,495 m (4,905 ft)
- Coordinates: 43°31′16″N 19°59′10″E

Geography
- Location: Southwestern Serbia
- Parent range: Dinaric Alps

Čemernica (Serbian Cyrillic: Чемерница) is a mountain in western Serbia, near the town of Ivanjica. Its highest peak Čemernica has an elevation of 1,495 m (4,905 ft) above sea level.

== See also ==
- List of mountains in Serbia
