= Tilva Njagra =

Mountain in Serbia

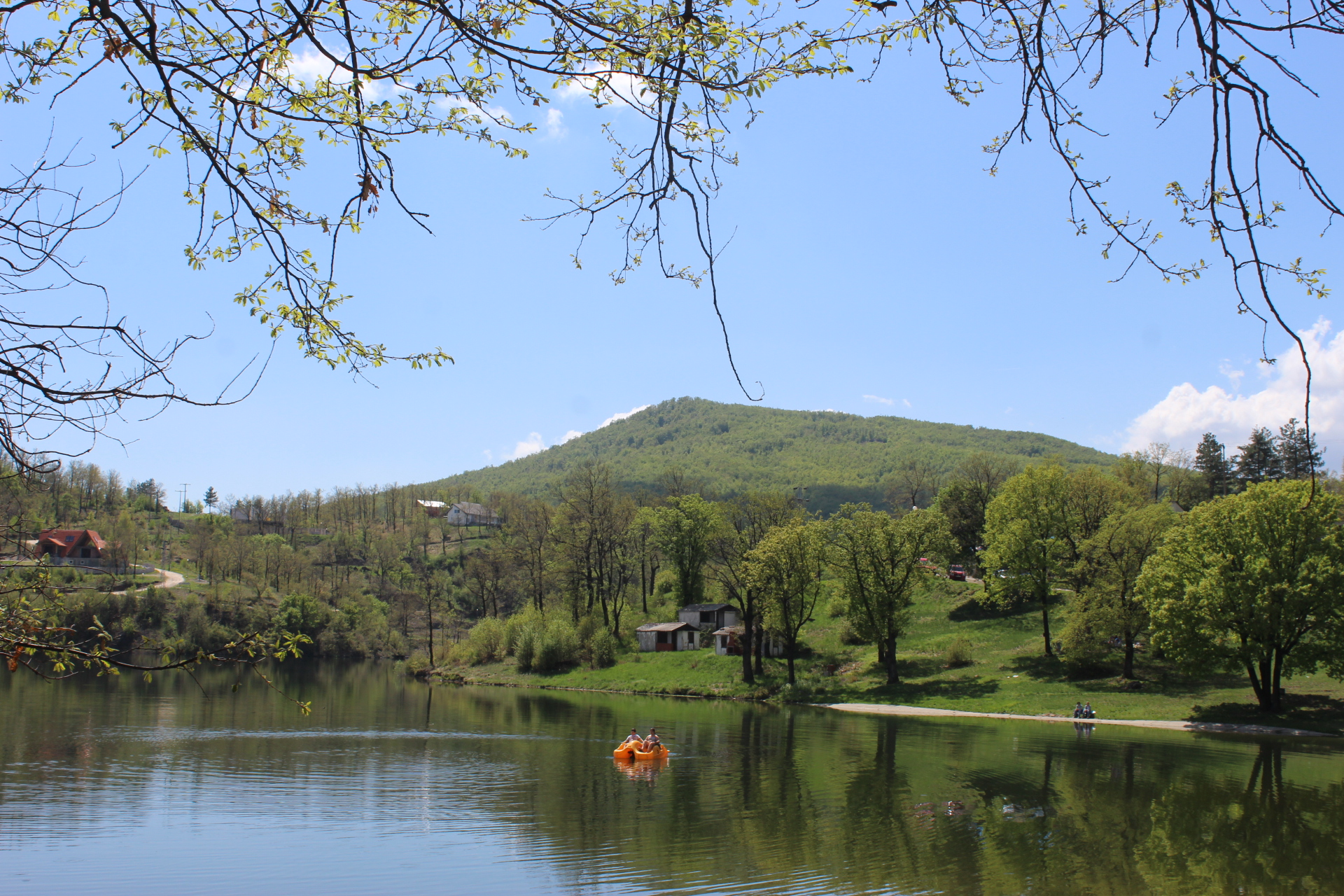

Highest point
- Elevation: 770 m (2,530 ft)
- Coordinates: 44°04′25″N 21°59′48″E

Geography
- Location within Serbia
- Location: Eastern Serbia
- Parent range: Carpathian Mountains

Tiljagra (Serbian Cyrillic: Тилва Њагра) is a mountain in eastern Serbia, near the town of Bor. Its highest peak has an elevation of 770 meters above sea level.

== See also ==
- List of mountains in Serbia
