= Magleš =

Mountain in Serbia

- Location within Serbia

Highest point
- Elevation: 1,036 m (3,399 ft)
- Coordinates: 44°08′54″N 19°50′31″E

Geography
- Location: Western Serbia
- Parent range: Dinaric Alps

Magleš (Serbian Cyrillic: Маглеш) is a mountain in western Serbia, near the city of Valjevo. Its highest peak, Pali, has an elevation of 1,036 meters above sea level.

== See also ==
- List of mountains in Serbia
