= Slemen =

Mountain in Serbia

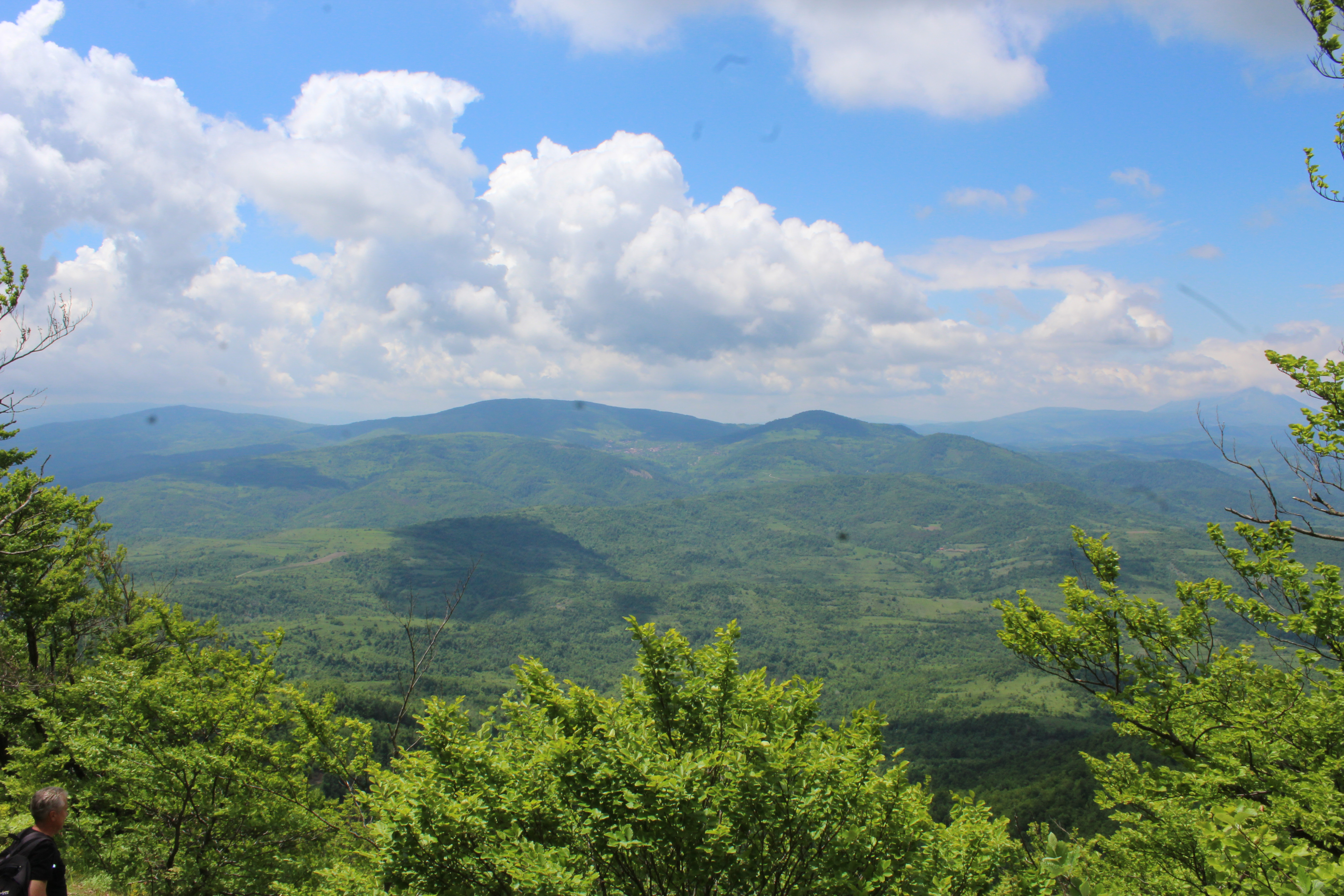

Highest point
- Elevation: 1,099 m (3,606 ft)
- Coordinates: 43°41′23″N 22°03′17″E

Geography
- Location within Serbia
- Location: Eastern Serbia
- Parent range: Carpathian Mountains

Slemen (Serbian Cyrillic: Слемен) is a mountain in eastern Serbia, near the town of Knjaževac. Its highest peak has an elevation of 1,099 meters above sea level.

== See also ==
- List of mountains in Serbia
