= Šljivovik =

Mountain in Serbia

- Location within Serbia

Highest point
- Elevation: 1,258 m (4,127 ft)
- Coordinates: 43°09′50″N 22°21′21″E

Geography
- Location: Southern Serbia

Šljivovik (Serbian Cyrillic: Шљивовик) is a mountain in southern Serbia, near the town of Bela Palanka. Its highest peak, Šljivovički vrh, has an elevation of 1258 meters above sea level.

== See also ==
- List of mountains in Serbia
