= Gradina (mountain) =

Mountain in Serbia

- Location within Serbia

Highest point
- Elevation: 1,446 m (4,744 ft)
- Coordinates: 43°25′37″N 19°20′29″E

Geography
- Location: Serbia / Montenegro
- Parent range: Dinaric Alps

Gradina (Serbian Cyrillic: Градина) is a mountain on the border of Serbia and Montenegro, between cities of Priboj and Pljevlja. Its highest peak Bandjer has an elevation of 1,446 m (4,744 ft) above sea level.

== See also ==
- List of mountains in Serbia
