= Rožanj (Gornji Milanovac) =

Mountain in Serbia

- Location within Serbia

Highest point
- Elevation: 601 m (1,972 ft)
- Coordinates: 43°59′26″N 20°20′38″E

Geography
- Location: Central Serbia
- Parent range: Dinaric Alps

Rožanj (Serbian Cyrillic: Рожањ) is a mountain in central Serbia, above the town of Gornji Milanovac. Its highest peak, Kobiljača, has an elevation of 601 meters above sea level.

== See also ==
- List of mountains in Serbia
