= Samanjac =

Mountain in Serbia

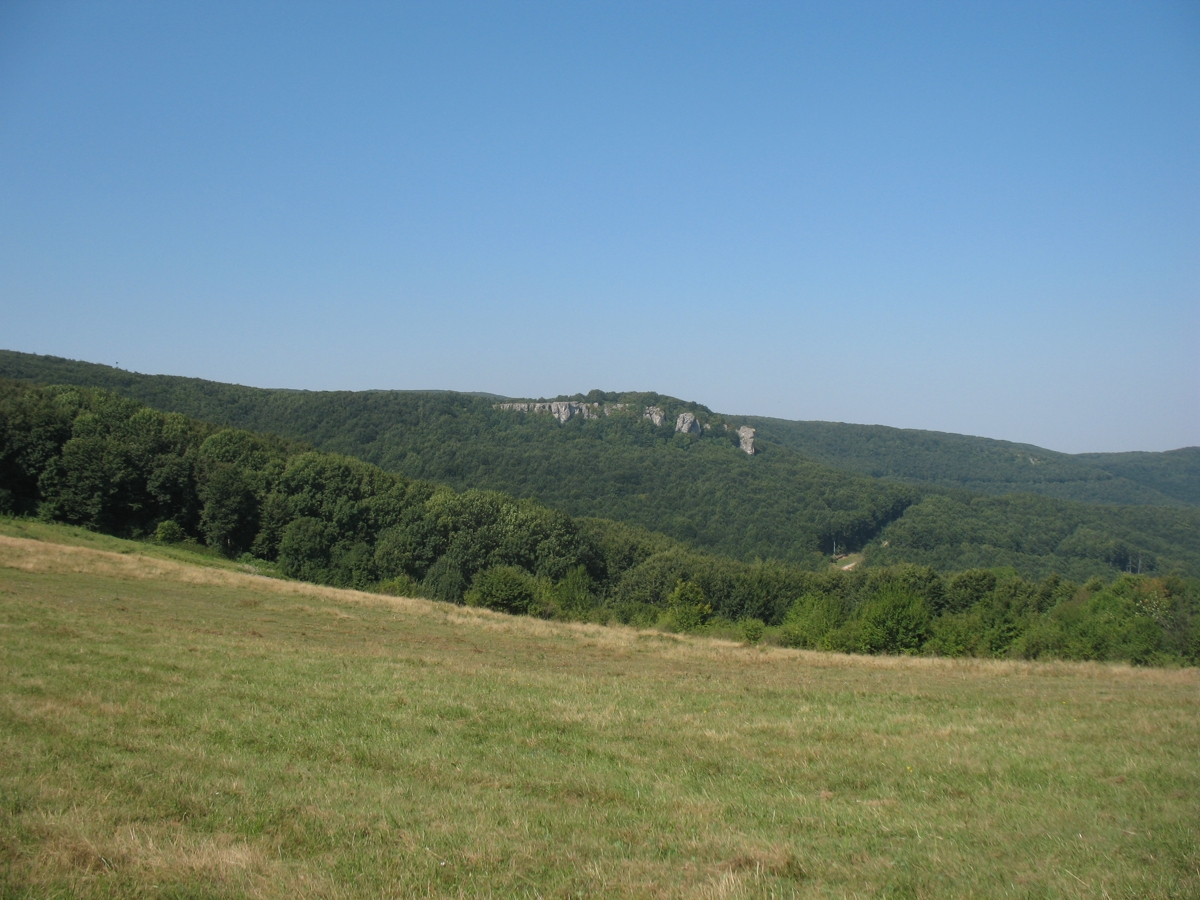

Highest point
- Elevation: 853 m (2,799 ft)
- Coordinates: 43°47′41″N 21°40′51″E

Geography
- Location within Serbia
- Location: Eastern Serbia
- Parent range: Carpathian Mountains

Samanjac (Serbian Cyrillic: Самањац) is a mountain in eastern Serbia, near the town of Boljevac. Its highest peak has an elevation of 853 meters above sea level.

== See also ==
- List of mountains in Serbia
