= Željin =

Mountain in Serbia

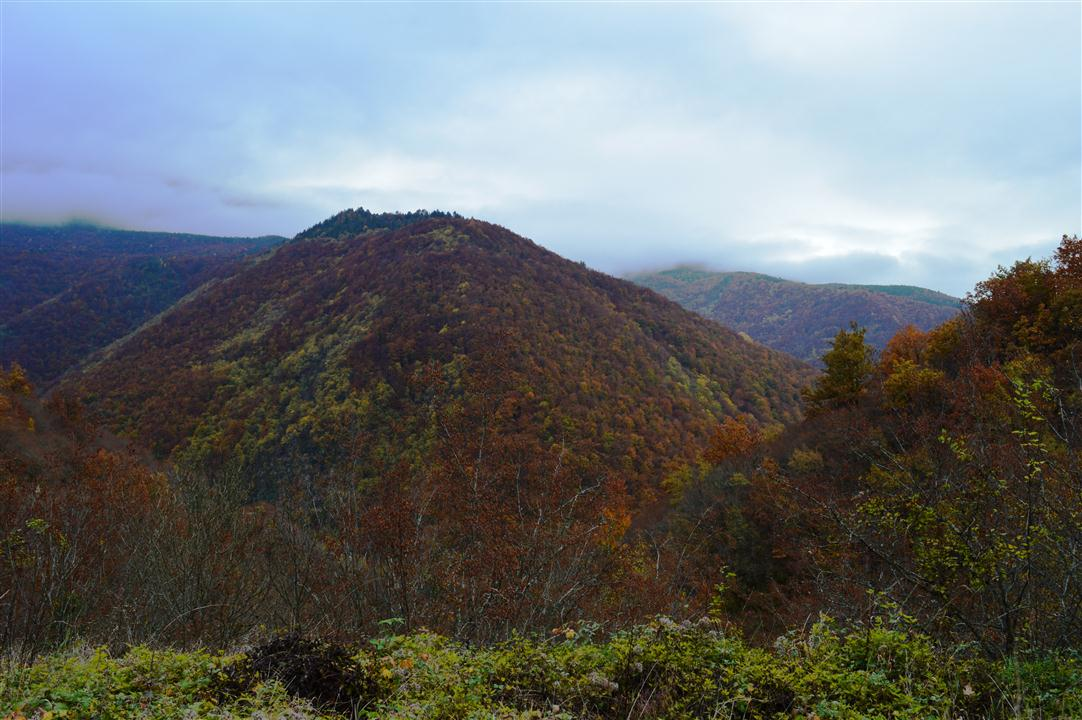

Highest point
- Elevation: 1,785 m (5,856 ft)
- Coordinates: 43°28′44″N 20°48′18″E

Geography
- Location within Serbia
- Location: Central Serbia
- Parent range: Dinaric Alps

Željin (Serbian Cyrillic: Жељин) is a mountain in central Serbia, near the town of Vrnjačka Banja. Its highest peak, Željin, has an elevation of 1,785 meters above sea level.

== See also ==
- List of mountains in Serbia

== Sources ==
- "Eko klub Željin" (in Serbian).
