= Debela Gora =

Mountain in Serbia

- Location within Serbia

Highest point
- Elevation: 791 m (2,595 ft)
- Coordinates: 43°53′14″N 20°10′00″E

Geography
- Location: Central Serbia
- Parent range: Dinaric Alps

Debela gora (Serbian Cyrillic: Дебела гора) is a mountain in western Serbia, above the town of Lučani. Its highest peak Branojevac (Бранојевац) has an elevation of 791 meters above sea level.

== See also ==
- List of mountains in Serbia
