= Kukutnica =

Mountain in Serbia

- Location within Serbia

Highest point
- Elevation: 1,382 m (4,534 ft)
- Coordinates: 43°36′08″N 20°01′40″E

Geography
- Location: Western Serbia
- Parent range: Dinaric Alps

Kukutnica (Serbian Cyrillic: Кукутница) is a mountain in western Serbia, near the town of Arilje. Its highest peak has an elevation of 1,382 meters above sea level.

== See also ==
- List of mountains in Serbia
