= Banjsko Brdo =

Mountain in Serbia

Banjsko Brdo Бањско брдо
- Location within Serbia

Highest point
- Elevation: 1,282 m (4,206 ft)
- Coordinates: 43°32′21″N 19°35′52″E

Geography
- Location: Southwestern Serbia
- Parent range: Dinaric Alps

Banjsko brdo (Serbian Cyrillic: Бањско брдо) is a mountain in southwestern Serbia, above the town of Priboj. Its highest peak has an elevation of 1,282 meters above sea level.

== See also ==
- List of mountains in Serbia
