= Javorište =

Mountain in Serbia

- Location within Serbia

Highest point
- Elevation: 1,213 m (3,980 ft)
- Coordinates: 44°01′57″N 21°47′29″E

Geography
- Location: Eastern Serbia
- Parent range: Carpathian Mountains

Javorište (Serbian Cyrillic: Јавориште) is a mountain in eastern Serbia, near the town of Resavica. Its highest peak, Oštri kamen, has an elevation of 1,213 meters above sea level. It is part of wider Kučaj mountain system.

== See also ==
- List of mountains in Serbia
