= Lepa Gora =

Mountain in Serbia

- Location within Serbia

Highest point
- Elevation: 1,196 m (3,924 ft)
- Coordinates: 43°14′48″N 21°07′20″E

Geography
- Location: Central Serbia
- Parent range: Dinaric Alps

Lepa gora (Serbian Cyrillic: Лепа гора) is a mountain in southern Serbia, near the town of Kuršumlija. Its highest peak, Crna čuka, has an elevation of 1,196 meters above sea level.

== See also ==
- List of mountains in Serbia
