= Oštrik =

Mountain in Serbia

- Location within Serbia

Highest point
- Elevation: 1,283 m (4,209 ft)
- Coordinates: 43°30′13″N 19°39′21″E

Geography
- Location: Southwestern Serbia
- Parent range: Dinaric Alps

Oštrik (Serbian Cyrillic: Оштрик) is a mountain in southwestern Serbia, between towns of Priboj, Prijepolje and Nova Varoš. Its highest peak, Veliki Oštrik, has an elevation of 1,283 meters above sea level.

== See also ==
- List of mountains in Serbia
