= Tresibaba =

Mountain in Serbia

- Location within Serbia

Highest point
- Elevation: 826 m (2,710 ft)
- Coordinates: 43°26′10″N 22°21′21″E

Geography
- Location: Eastern Serbia
- Parent range: Balkan Mountains

Tresibaba (Serbian Cyrillic: Тресибаба) is a mountain in eastern Serbia, between the towns of Svrljig and Knjaževac. Its highest peak, Čukar, has an elevation of 826 meters above sea level.

== See also ==
- List of mountains in Serbia
