= Široka planina =

Mountain in Serbia

- Location within Serbia

Highest point
- Elevation: 1,345 m (4,413 ft)
- Coordinates: 42°19′27″N 22°02′02″E

Geography
- Location: Southern Serbia
- Parent range: Rhodope Mountains

Široka planina (Serbian: Широка планина) is a mountain in southern Serbia, near the town of Trgovište. Its highest peak, Kopljača, has an elevation of 1,345 meters above sea level.

== See also ==
- List of mountains in Serbia
