= Seličevica =

Mountain in Serbia

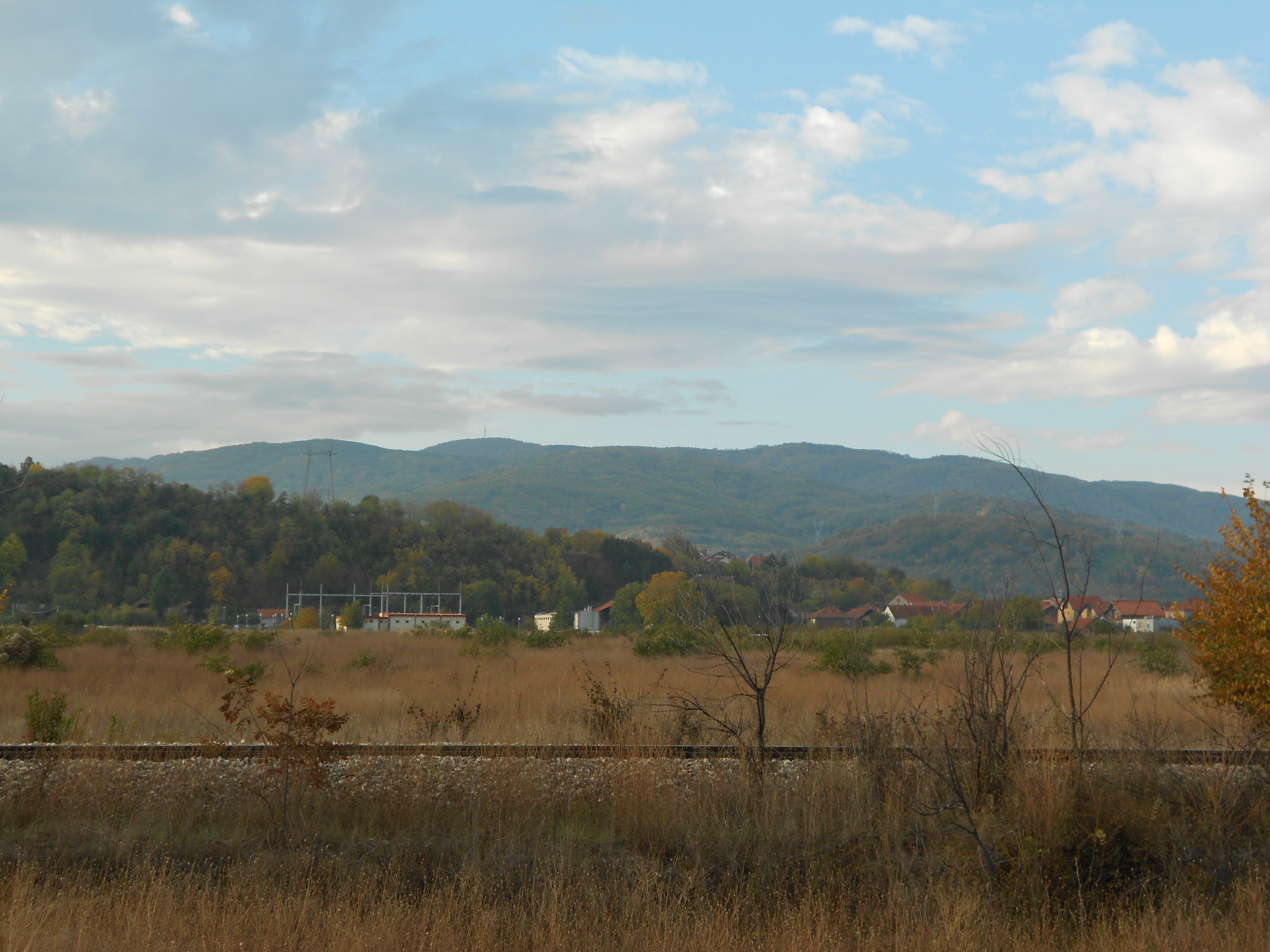

Highest point
- Elevation: 903 m (2,963 ft)
- Coordinates: 43°14′10″N 21°58′12″E

Geography
- Location within Serbia
- Location: Southern Serbia

Seličevica (Serbian Cyrillic: Селичевица) is a mountain in southern Serbia, near the city of Niš. Its highest peak, Velika Tumba, has an elevation of 903 meters above sea level.

== See also ==
- List of mountains in Serbia
