= Kravarska planina =

Mountain in Serbia

- Location within Serbia

Highest point
- Elevation: 1,002 m (3,287 ft)
- Coordinates: 42°56′26″N 21°20′23″E

Geography
- Location: Southern Serbia
- Parent range: Dinaric Alps

Kravarska planina (Serbian Cyrillic: Краварска планина) is a mountain in southern Serbia, near the town of Kuršumlija. Its highest peak, Kravarska glava, has an elevation of 1002 meters above sea level.

== See also ==
- List of mountains in Serbia
