= Zladovska planina =

Mountain in Serbia

- Location within Serbia

Highest point
- Elevation: 1,574 m (5,164 ft)
- Coordinates: 42°25′20″N 22°06′35″E

Geography
- Location: Southern Serbia
- Parent range: Rhodope Mountains

Zladovska planina (Serbian Cyrillic: Зладовска планина) is a mountain in southern Serbia, near the town of Trgovište. Its highest peak, Zelenčev vrh, has an elevation of 1,574 meters above sea level.

== See also ==
- List of mountains in Serbia
