= Nemić =

Mountain in Serbia

- Location within Serbia

Highest point
- Elevation: 797 m (2,615 ft)
- Coordinates: 44°10′43″N 19°26′03″E

Geography
- Location: Western Serbia
- Parent range: Dinaric Alps

Nemić (Serbian Cyrillic: Немић) is a mountain in western Serbia, above the town of Ljubovija. Its highest peak has an elevation of 797 meters above sea level.

== See also ==
- List of mountains in Serbia
