= Subjel (mountain) =

Mountain in Serbia

- Location within Serbia

Highest point
- Elevation: 924 m (3,031 ft)
- Coordinates: 44°00′52″N 19°58′59″E

Geography
- Location: Western Serbia
- Parent range: Dinaric Alps

Subjel (Serbian Cyrillic: Субјел) is a mountain in western Serbia, near the town of Kosjerić. Its highest peak, Subjel, has an elevation of 924 meters above sea level.

== See also ==
- List of mountains in Serbia
