= Kozomor =

Mountain in Serbia

- Location within Serbia

Highest point
- Elevation: 1,007 m (3,304 ft)
- Coordinates: 44°05′25″N 19°56′43″E

Geography
- Location: Western Serbia
- Parent range: Dinaric Alps

Kozomor (Serbian Cyrillic: Козомор) is a mountain in western Serbia. Its highest peak, Veliki Kozomor, has an elevation of 1,007 meters above sea level. It lies near the town of Kosjerić.

== See also ==
- List of mountains in Serbia
