= Golemi Stol =

Mountain in Serbia

- Location within Serbia

Highest point
- Elevation: 1,238 m (4,062 ft)
- Coordinates: 43°01′43″N 22°29′42″E

Geography
- Location: Southern Serbia
- Parent range: Balkan Mountains

Golemi Stol (Serbian Cyrillic: Големи Стол) is a mountain in southern Serbia, near the town of Babušnica. Its highest peak has an elevation of 1238 meters above sea level.

== See also ==
- List of mountains in Serbia
