= Radočelo =

Mountain in Serbia

- Location within Serbia

Highest point
- Elevation: 1,643 m (5,390 ft)
- Coordinates: 43°28′27″N 20°28′21″E

Geography
- Location: Southwestern Serbia
- Parent range: Dinaric Alps

Radočelo (Serbian Cyrillic: Радочело) is a mountain located in southwestern Serbia, near the Kraljevo's village of Ušće, and towns of Raška and Ivanjica. The mountain's highest peak, Krivača, has an elevation of 1,643 meters above sea level. The Studenica Monastery can be found on the northeastern slopes of the mountain, while the southwest part is home to carbon cliffs.

== See also ==
- List of mountains in Serbia
