= Maidan (disambiguation) =

Maidan is an originally Persian word for a town square or public gathering place, used in many place names.

Maidan may refer to:

- Maidan (1982 film), a Pakistani Punjabi film
- Maidaan, 2024 Indian sports biographical film by Amit Sharma, about Indian football coach Syed Abdul Rahim
- Maidan (Kolkata), park in Kolkata, India
- Maidan (Karnataka), area of Karnataka state in India
- Majdanpek, a town and municipality in Serbia known as Maidan by the local Romanians

== In history ==
- Maidan Nezalezhnosti ("Independence Square"), a city square in Kyiv, Ukraine
- Euromaidan, a 2013–2014 series of protests "on the Maidan", centered around Maidan Nezalezhnosti
- Revolution of Dignity (the Maidan Revolution), the result of the Euromaidan protests
- Maidan (2014 film), a documentary film about the Maidan Uprising

== See also ==
- Majdan (disambiguation)
- Medan (disambiguation)
- Al Mayadeen, a pan-Arabist satellite television channel launched on 11 June 2012 in Beirut, Lebanon
- Al-Maydān, Egyptian weekly newspaper
- Bijapur Fort#Malik-e-Maidan, a cannon of the 16th century and artifact of the Old India
