= Projić =

Mountain in Serbia

- Location within Serbia

Highest point
- Elevation: 1,256 m (4,121 ft)
- Coordinates: 43°29′33″N 19°22′47″E

Geography
- Location: Southwestern Serbia
- Parent range: Dinaric Alps

Projić (Serbian Cyrillic: Пројић) is a mountain in southwestern Serbia, near the town of Priboj. Its highest peak has an elevation of 1,256 meters above sea level.

== See also ==
- List of mountains in Serbia
