= Bukovik (central Serbia) =

Mountain in Serbia

- Location within Serbia

Highest point
- Elevation: 851 m (2,792 ft)
- Coordinates: 43°57′14″N 20°31′11″E

Geography
- Location: Central Serbia
- Parent range: Dinaric

Bukovik (Serbian Cyrillic: Буковик) is a mountain in central Serbia, above the town of Gornji Milanovac. Its highest peak has an elevation of 851 meters above sea level.

== See also ==
- List of mountains in Serbia
