= Golubac (mountain) =

Mountain in Serbia

- Location within Serbia

Highest point
- Elevation: 733 m (2,405 ft)
- Coordinates: 43°44′11″N 20°11′53″E

Geography
- Location: Southwestern Serbia
- Parent range: Dinaric Alps

Golubac (Serbian Cyrillic: Голубац) is a mountain in southwestern Serbia, near the town of Guča. Its highest peak, Stanojev vrh, has an elevation of 733 meters above sea level.

== See also ==
- List of mountains in Serbia
