= Crni Vrh (Jagodina) =

Mountain in Serbia

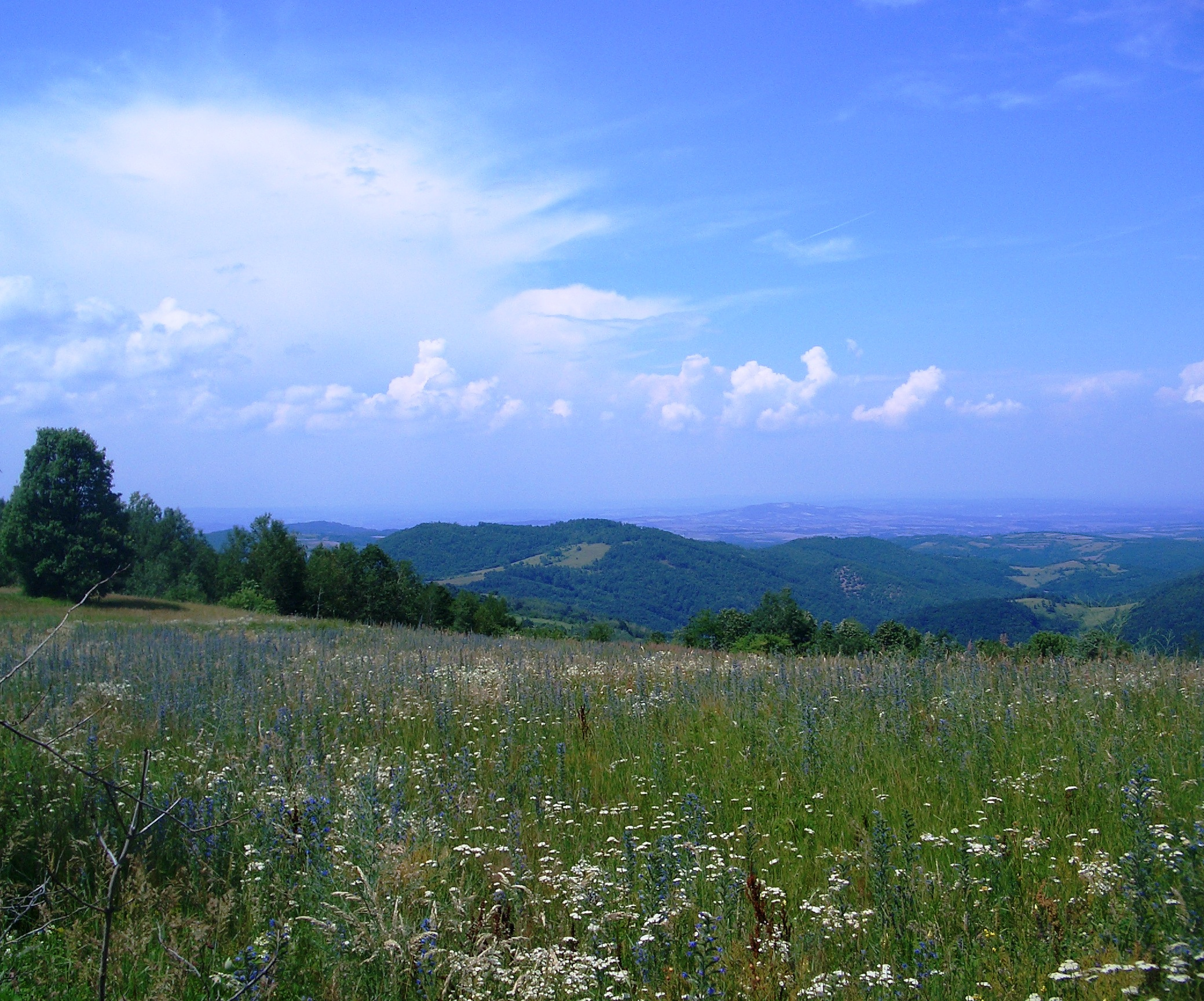

Highest point
- Elevation: 707 m (2,320 ft)
- Coordinates: 44°00′32″N 21°06′41″E

Geography
- Location within Serbia
- Location: Central Serbia
- Parent range: Dinaric Alps

Crni Vrh (Serbian Cyrillic: Црни врх) is a mountain in central Serbia, to the west of the town of Jagodina. Its highest peak Crni vrh has an elevation of 707 m (2,320 ft) above sea level. It has two ski tracks of around 750 meters each and a mountaineering hut at the top.

== See also ==
- List of mountains in Serbia
