= Medan (disambiguation) =

Medan is the capital city of North Sumatra province, Indonesia.

Medan may also refer to:

== People ==
- Medan (son of Abraham), third son of Abraham and Keturah
- Yaaqov Medan (born 1950), Israeli rabbi
- Anton Medan (1957–2021), Indonesian criminal
- Saint Medan, early Christian saint in Britain

== Others ==
- Médan, Yvelines, France
- SS Ourang Medan, a wrecked merchant ship
  - The Dark Pictures Anthology: Man of Medan, a video game inspired by the ship

== See also ==
- Maidan (disambiguation)
