= Bitovik =

Mountain in Serbia

- Location within Serbia

Highest point
- Elevation: 1,371 m (4,498 ft)
- Coordinates: 43°26′53″N 19°41′34″E

Geography
- Location: Southwestern Serbia
- Parent range: Dinaric Alps

Bitovik (Serbian Cyrillic: Битовик) is a mountain in southwestern Serbia. Its highest peak has an elevation of 1,371 m (4,498 ft) above sea level.

== See also ==
- List of mountains in Serbia
