= Troglav (Serbia) =

Mountain in Serbia

- Location within Serbia

Highest point
- Elevation: 1,178 m (3,865 ft)
- Coordinates: 43°38′27″N 20°29′13″E

Geography
- Location: Central Serbia
- Parent range: Dinaric Alps

Troglav (Serbian Cyrillic: Троглав) is a mountain in central Serbia, near the city of Kraljevo. Its highest peak, Kom, has an elevation of 1,178 meters above sea level.

== See also ==
- List of mountains in Serbia
