= Krstac (mountain) =

Mountain in Serbia

- Location within Serbia

Highest point
- Elevation: 699 m (2,293 ft)
- Coordinates: 43°47′39″N 20°11′37″E

Geography
- Location: Western Serbia
- Parent range: Dinaric Alps

Krstac (Serbian Cyrillic: Крстац) is a mountain in central Serbia, near the town of Guča. Its highest peak, Lis, has an elevation of 699 meters above sea level.

== See also ==
- List of mountains in Serbia
