= Gloška planina =

Mountain in southern Serbia

- Location within Serbia

Highest point
- Elevation: 1,756 m (5,761 ft)
- Coordinates: 42°31′41″N 22°22′32″E

Geography
- Location: Southern Serbia
- Parent range: Rhodope Mountains

Gloška planina (Serbian Cyrillic: Глошка планина) is a mountain in southern Serbia, near the town of Bosilegrad. Its highest peak Mečit has an elevation of 1,756 m (5,761 ft) above sea level.

== See also ==
- List of mountains in Serbia
