= Crni Vrh (Priboj) =

Mountain of Serbia

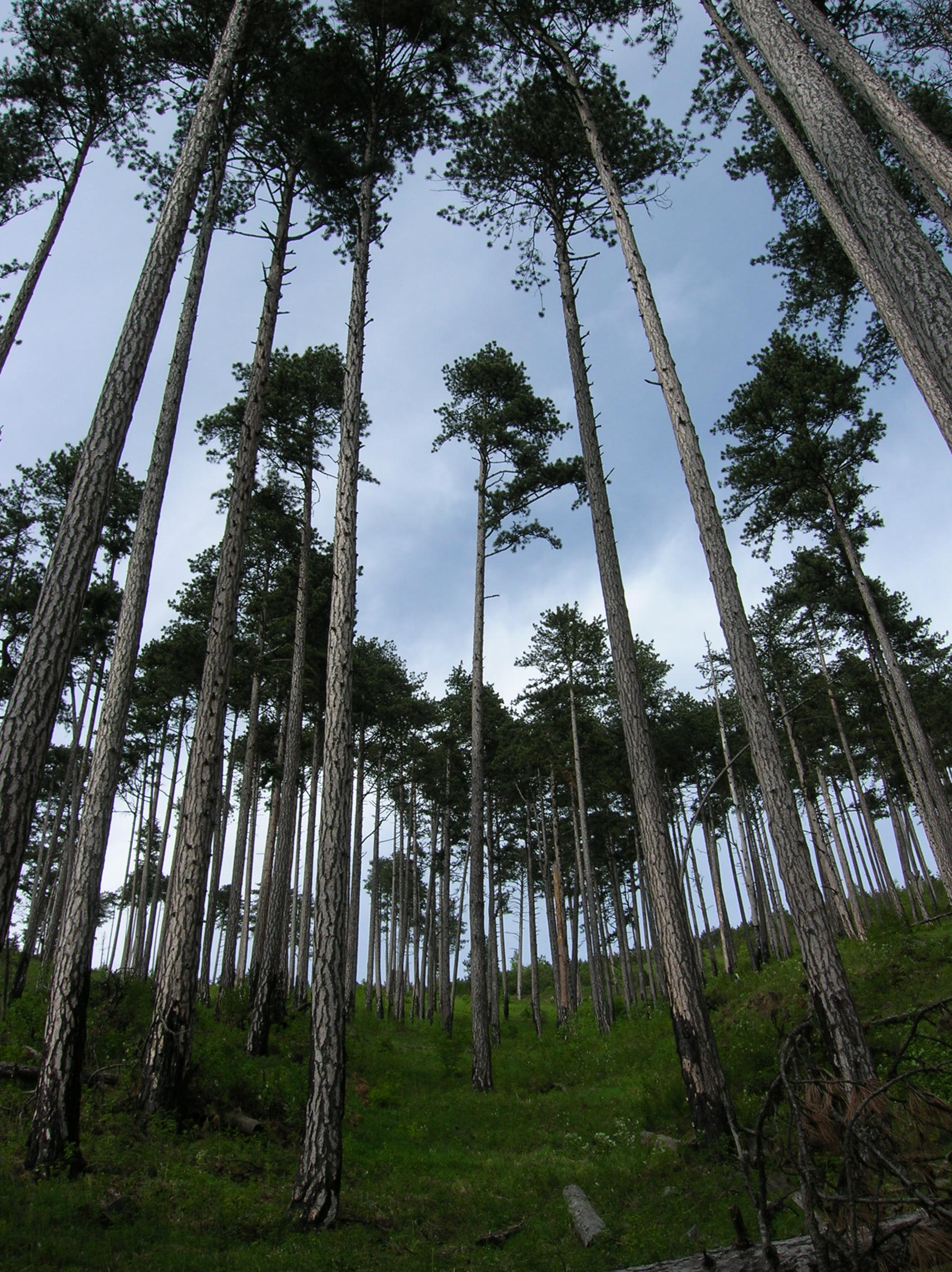

Highest point
- Elevation: 1,188 m (3,898 ft)
- Coordinates: 43°35′28″N 19°34′12″E

Geography
- Location within Serbia
- Location: Western Serbia
- Parent range: Dinaric Alps

Crni Vrh (Serbian Cyrillic: Црни врх) is a mountain in southwestern Serbia, above the town of Priboj. Its highest peak Crni vrh has an elevation of 1,188 m (3,898 ft) above sea level.

== See also ==
- List of mountains in Serbia
