= Goli Krš =

Mountain in Serbia

- Location within Serbia

Highest point
- Elevation: 887 m (2,910 ft)
- Coordinates: 44°08′05″N 22°10′13″E

Geography
- Location: Eastern Serbia
- Parent range: Carpathian Mountains

Goli Krš (Serbian Cyrillic: Голи Крш) is a mountain in eastern Serbia, near the town of Bor. Its highest peak has an elevation of 887 meters above sea level.

== See also ==
- List of mountains in Serbia
