= Crvena Gora =

Mountain in Serbia

- Location within Serbia

Highest point
- Elevation: 1,215 m (3,986 ft)
- Coordinates: 43°32′08″N 20°08′38″E

Geography
- Location: Southwestern Serbia
- Parent range: Dinaric Alps

Crvena gora (Serbian Cyrillic: Црвена гора) is a mountain in western Serbia, above the town of Ivanjica. Its highest peak Opaljenička ćava (Опаљеничка ћава) has an elevation of 1,215 m (3,986 ft) above sea level.

== See also ==
- List of mountains in Serbia
