= Šomrda =

Mountain in Serbia

- Location within Serbia

Highest point
- Elevation: 803 m (2,635 ft)
- Coordinates: 44°32′23″N 21°58′58″E

Geography
- Location: Eastern Serbia
- Parent range: Carpathian Mountains

Šomrda (Serbian Cyrillic: Шомрда) is a mountain in eastern Serbia, near the town of Lepenski Vir. Its highest peak has an elevation of 803 meters above sea level. Most of Šomrda is located in the Đerdap National Park.

== See also ==
- List of mountains in Serbia
