= Rgajska planina =

Mountain in Serbia

- Location within Serbia

Highest point
- Elevation: 1,017 m (3,337 ft)
- Coordinates: 43°07′14″N 21°31′59″E

Geography
- Location: Southern Serbia
- Parent range: Dinaric Alps

Rgajska planina (Serbian Cyrillic: Ргајска планина, pronounced [r̩̂ɡaːjskaː planǐna]) is a mountain in southern Serbia, near the town of Prokuplje. Its highest peak has an elevation of 1,017 meters above sea level.

== See also ==
- List of mountains in Serbia
