= Jelova gora =

Mountain in Serbia

Jelova Gora
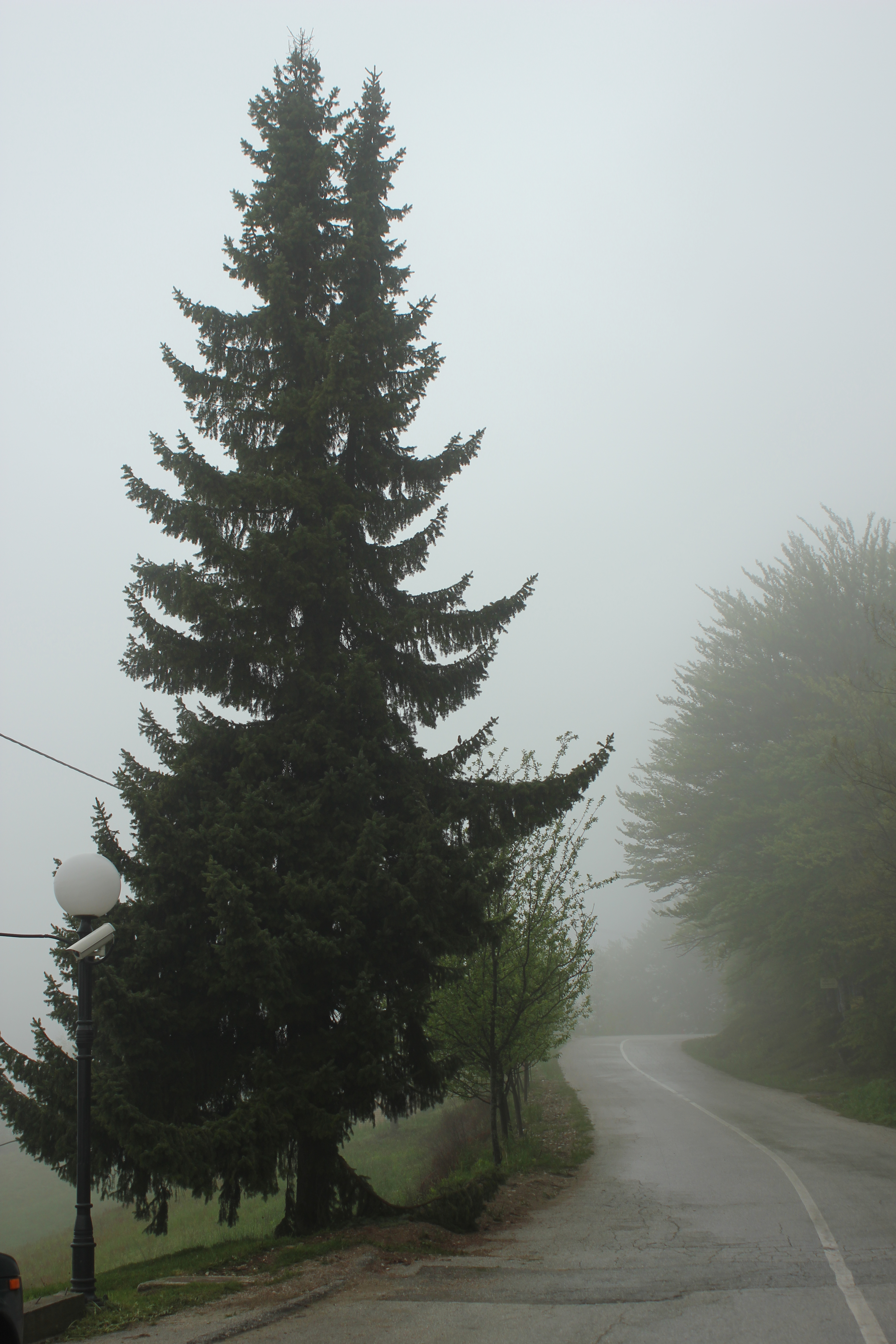

Highest point
- Elevation: 1,011 m (3,317 ft)
- Coordinates: 43°57′03″N 19°46′28″E

Geography
- Location within Serbia
- Location: Western Serbia
- Parent range: Dinaric Alps

Jelova gora (Serbian Cyrillic: Јелова гора) is a mountain in western Serbia, between towns of Užice and Bajina Bašta. Its highest peak, Jelenina glava, has an elevation of 1,011 meters above sea level.

== See also ==
- List of mountains in Serbia
