= Orovica =

Mountain in Serbia

- Location within Serbia

Highest point
- Elevation: 856 m (2,808 ft)
- Coordinates: 43°55′29″N 20°07′20″E

Geography
- Location: Southwestern Serbia
- Parent range: Dinaric Alps

Orovica (Serbian Cyrillic: Оровица) is a mountain in southwestern Serbia, near the town of Lučani. Its highest peak has an elevation of 856 meters above sea level.

== See also ==
- List of mountains in Serbia
