= Vlaška planina =

Mountain in Serbia

- Location within Serbia

Highest point
- Elevation: 1,443 m (4,734 ft)
- Coordinates: 42°59′12″N 22°35′16″E

Geography
- Location: Southern Serbia

Vlaška planina (Serbian Cyrillic: Влашка планина) is a mountain in southern Serbia, near the town of Dimitrovgrad. Its highest peak, Panica, has an elevation of 1,443 meters (4,734 ft) above sea level. With Greben, Vlaška planina forms the gorge of Jerma river.

== See also ==
- List of mountains in Serbia
