= Jabuka (mountain) =

Mountain in Serbia and Montenegro

- Location within Serbia

Highest point
- Elevation: 1,412 m (4,633 ft)
- Coordinates: 43°21′58″N 19°27′16″E

Geography
- Location: Serbia / Montenegro
- Parent range: Dinaric Alps

Jabuka (Serbian Cyrillic: Јабука) is a mountain and plateau on the border between Serbia and Montenegro, between towns of Prijepolje and Pljevlja. Its highest peak, Slatina, has an elevation of 1,412 meters above sea level.

== See also ==
- List of mountains in Serbia
