= Ostrica =

Mountain in Serbia

- Location within Serbia

Highest point
- Elevation: 802 m (2,631 ft)
- Coordinates: 43°56′03″N 20°31′54″E

Geography
- Location: Central Serbia
- Parent range: Dinaric Alps

Ostrica (Serbian Cyrillic: Острица) is a mountain in central Serbia, near the town of Gornji Milanovac. Its highest peak has an elevation of 802 meters above sea level.

== See also ==
- List of mountains in Serbia
