= Lisinska planina =

Mountain in Serbia

- Location within Serbia

Highest point
- Elevation: 1,829 m (6,001 ft)
- Coordinates: 42°32′57″N 22°18′43″E

Geography
- Location: Southern Serbia
- Parent range: Rhodope Mountains

Lisinska planina (Serbian Cyrillic: Лисинска планина) is a mountain in southern Serbia, near the town of Bosilegrad. Its highest peak, Valozi, has an elevation of 1829 meters above sea level.

== See also ==
- List of mountains in Serbia
