= Kruševica (mountain) =

Mountain in Serbia

- Location within Serbia

Highest point
- Elevation: 913 m (2,995 ft)
- Coordinates: 43°02′22″N 22°10′38″E

Geography
- Location: Southern Serbia
- Parent range: Balkan Mountains

Kruševica (Serbian Cyrillic: Крушевица) is a mountain in southern Serbia, near the town of Vlasotince. Its highest peak, Vita kruška, has an elevation of 913 meters above sea level.

== See also ==
- List of mountains in Serbia
