= Bešnjaja =

Mountain in Serbia

Bešnjaja Бешњаја
- Location within Serbia

Highest point
- Elevation: 613 m (2,011 ft)
- Coordinates: 43°58′45″N 21°01′58″E

Geography
- Location: Central Serbia
- Parent range: Dinaric Alps

Bešnjaja (Serbian Cyrillic: Бешњаја) is a mountain in central Serbia, lying between the cities of Kragujevac and Jagodina. Its highest peak Lisin laz has an elevation of 613 meters above sea level.

== See also ==
- List of mountains in Serbia
