= Javorje (Serbia) =

Mountain in Serbia

- Location within Serbia

Highest point
- Elevation: 1,486 m (4,875 ft)
- Coordinates: 43°32′36″N 19°17′59″E

Geography
- Location: Western Serbia
- Parent range: Dinaric Alps

Javorje (Serbian Cyrillic: Јаворје, pronounced [jǎʋɔːrjɛ]) is a mountain in western Serbia, near the town of Priboj. Its highest peak, Ober, has an elevation of 1,486 meters above sea level.

== See also ==
- List of mountains in Serbia
