= Stolovi =

Mountain in Serbia

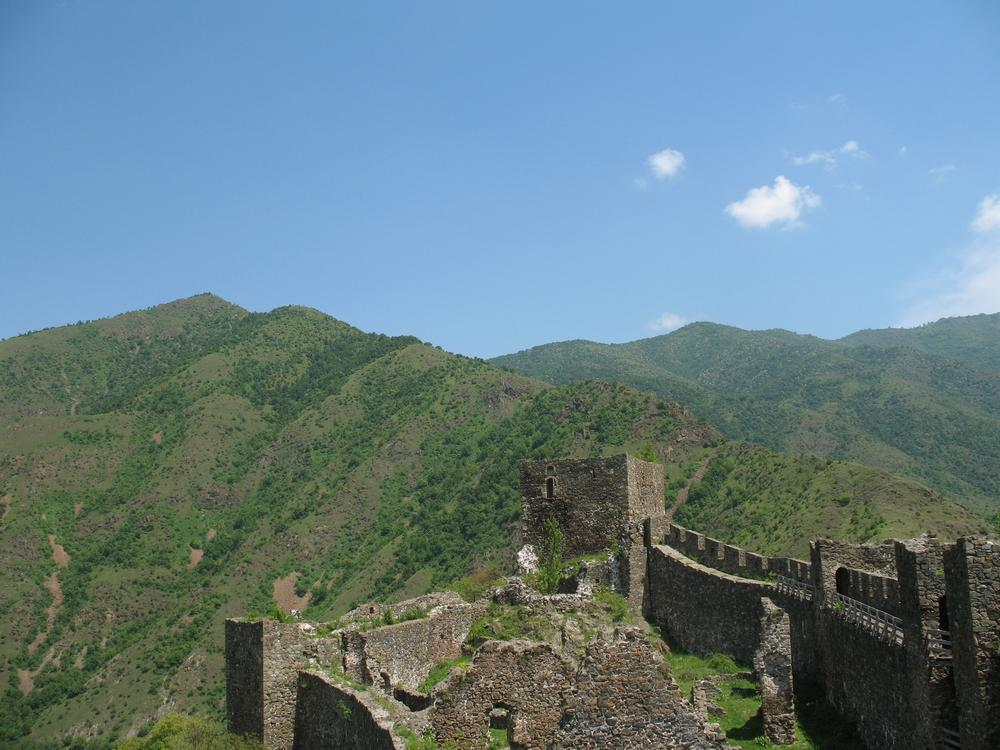
- View on Stolovi from Maglič Fortress

Highest point
- Elevation: 1,375 m (4,511 ft)
- Coordinates: 43°36′32″N 20°36′40″E

Geography
- Location within Serbia
- Location: Southwestern Serbia
- Parent range: Dinaric Alps

Stolovi (Serbian Cyrillic: Столови) is a mountain in southwestern Serbia, near the city of Kraljevo. Its highest peak, Usovica, has an elevation of 1,356 meters above sea level.

== See also ==
- List of mountains in Serbia
