= Stojkovačka planina =

Mountain in Serbia

- Location within Serbia

Highest point
- Elevation: 1,360 m (4,460 ft)
- Coordinates: 43°32′04″N 20°22′21″E

Geography
- Location: Southwestern Serbia
- Parent range: Dinaric Alps

Stojkovačka planina (Serbian Cyrillic: Стојковачка планина) is a mountain in southwestern Serbia, above the town of Ivanjica. Its highest peak has an elevation of 1,360 meters above sea level.

== See also ==
- List of mountains in Serbia
