= Malič =

Mountain in Serbia

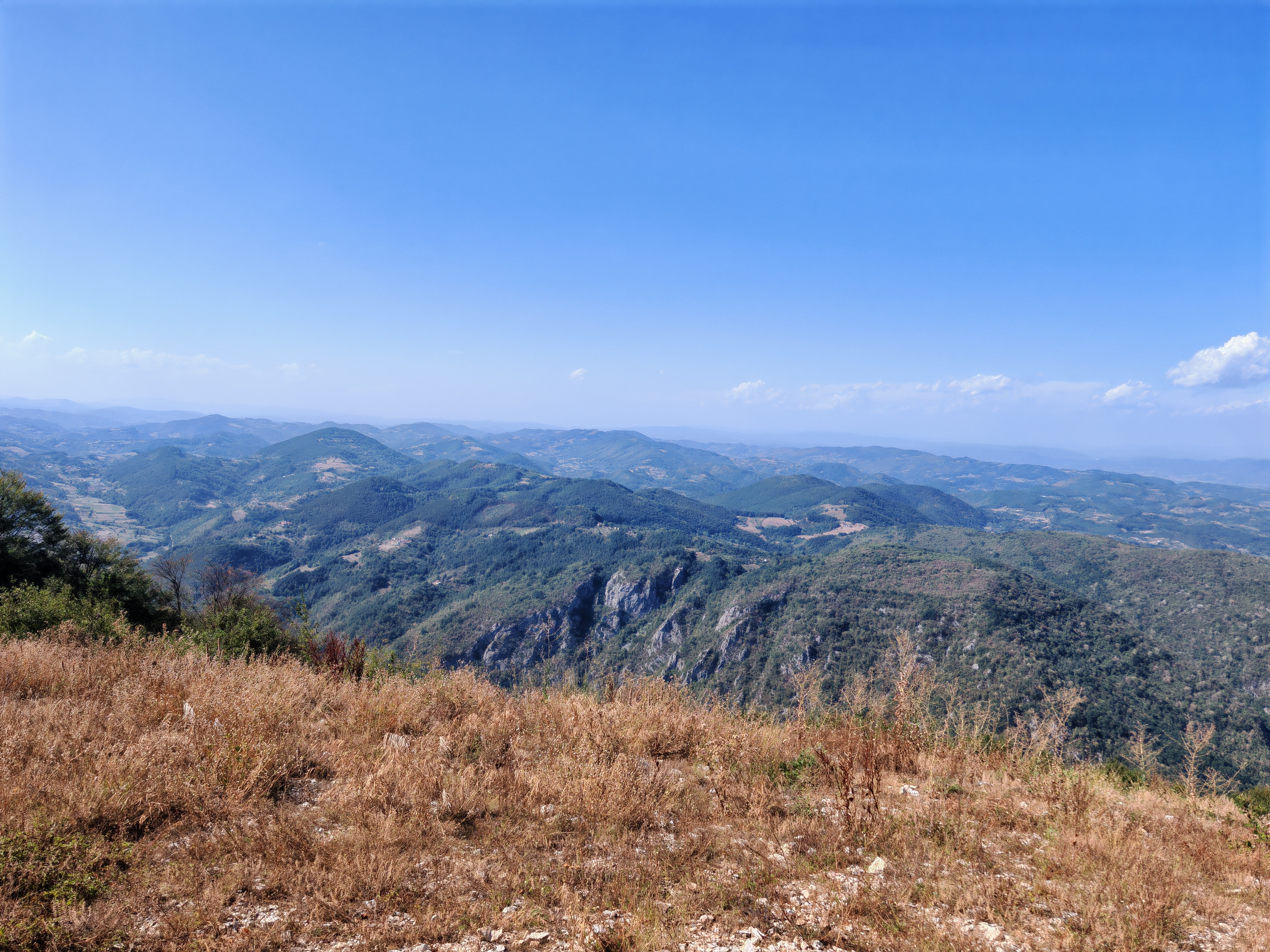

Highest point
- Elevation: 1,110 m (3,640 ft)
- Coordinates: 43°38′58″N 20°06′12″E

Geography
- Location within Serbia
- Location: Western Serbia
- Parent range: Dinaric Alps

Malič (Serbian Cyrillic: Малич) is a mountain in western Serbia, near the towns of Arilje and Ivanjica. Its highest peak has an elevation of 1,110 meters above sea level.

== See also ==
- List of mountains in Serbia
