= Ravna planina =

Mountain in Serbia

- Location within Serbia

Highest point
- Elevation: 1,542 m (5,059 ft)
- Coordinates: 43°31′21″N 20°46′46″E

Geography
- Location: Serbia
- Parent range: Dinaric Alps

Ravna planina (Serbian Cyrillic: Равна планина) is a mountain in southwestern Serbia, near the town of Vrnjačka Banja. Its highest peak, Crni vrh, has an elevation of 1,542 meters above sea level.

== See also ==
- List of mountains in Serbia
