= Kotlenik =

Mountain in Serbia

- Location within Serbia

Highest point
- Elevation: 749 m (2,457 ft)
- Coordinates: 43°50′35″N 20°40′43″E

Geography
- Location: Central Serbia
- Parent range: Dinaric Alps

Kotlenik (Serbian Cyrillic: Котленик) is a mountain in central Serbia, near the town of Kraljevo. Its highest peak, Veliki vrh, has an elevation of 749 meters above sea level.

== See also ==
- List of mountains in Serbia
