= Majdan, Zavidovići =

Majdan
- Village
- Location within Bosnia and Herzegovina
- Coordinates: 44.4558537°N 18.1493105°E
- Country: Bosnia and Herzegovina
- Entity: Federation of Bosnia and Herzegovina
- Canton: Zenica-Doboj
- Municipality: Zavidovići

Area
  - Total: 0.17 sq mi (0.45 km^{2})

Population (2013)
  - Total: 478
  - Density: 2,800/sq mi (1,100/km^{2})
- Time zone: UTC+1 (CET)
  - Summer (DST): UTC+2 (CEST)

Majdan is a village in the municipality of Zavidovići, Bosnia and Herzegovina.

== Demographics ==
According to the 2013 census, its population was 478.

Ethnicity in 2013
Ethnicity	Number	Percentage
Bosniaks	462	96.7%
other/undeclared	16	3.3%
Total	478	100%
