= Bić =

Mountain on the border of Serbia and Bosnia

- Location within Serbia

Highest point
- Elevation: 1,386 m (4,547 ft)
- Coordinates: 43°34′10″N 19°29′22″E

Geography
- Location: Serbia / Bosnia and Herzegovina
- Parent range: Dinaric Alps

Bić (Serbian Cyrillic: Бић) is a mountain on the border of Serbia and Bosnia and Herzegovina, above the town of Priboj. Its highest peak Golet has an elevation of 1,386 m (4,547 ft) above sea level. At the foot of the mountain is the medieval fortress of Jagat.

== See also ==
- List of mountains in Serbia
