= Majdan (mountain in Serbia) =

Mountain in Serbia

- Location within Serbia

Highest point
- Elevation: 1,096 m (3,596 ft)
- Coordinates: 42°55′36″N 21°27′26″E

Geography
- Location: Southern Serbia
- Parent range: Dinaric Alps

Majdan (Serbian Cyrillic: Мајдан) is a mountain in southern Serbia, near the town of Medveđa. Its highest peak, Vratnica Jokovića, has an elevation of 1096 meters above sea level.

== See also ==
- List of mountains in Serbia
