= Zlot, Bor =

Village in Bor District, Serbia

Zlot Злот
- Village
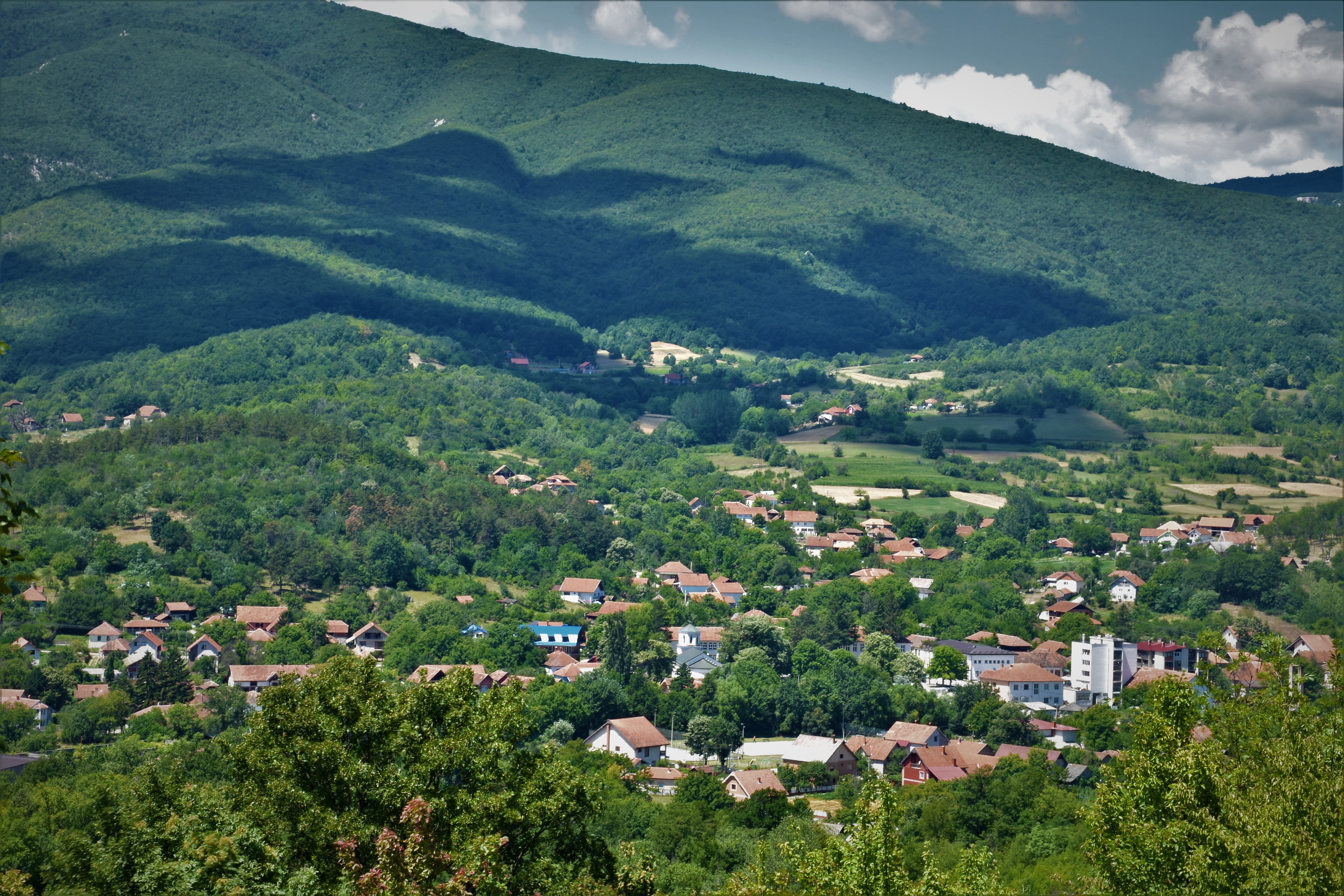
- Panoramic view of Zlot

- Location within Serbia
- Coordinates: 44°00′35″N 21°59′08″E
- Country: Serbia
- District: Bor District
- Municipality: Bor

Area
  - Total: 88.75 sq mi (229.87 km^{2})

Population (2022)
  - Total: 2,675
  - Density: 30.1/sq mi (11.64/km^{2})
- Time zone: UTC+1 (CET)
  - Summer (DST): UTC+2 (CEST)

Zlot (Serbian Cyrillic: Злот) is a village in the municipality of Bor, Serbia. According to the 2022 census, the village has a population of 2,675 people.

1890 the population was higher at 3,850 inhabitants.

== Demographics ==
Historical population
Year	Pop.	±% p.a.
1948	5,465	—
1953	5,661	+0.71%
1961	5,538	−0.27%
1971	5,233	−0.56%
1981	4,918	−0.62%
1991	4,280	−1.38%
2002	3,757	−1.18%
2011	3,299	−1.43%
2022	2,675	−1.89%
