= Majdan (mountain in Kosovo) =

Mountain peak in the Kopaonik mountain range, Kosovo

Majdan (Serbian Cyrillic: Мајдан) is a mountain peak forming part of the Kopaonik mountain range in Kosovo. Majdan reaches a top height of 1,246m and is located a few kilometres north-east of the city of Mitrovica. The Ibar River flows on the western side of the mountain. Beowulf Mining drills the peak.
