= Krnja Jela (Sjenica) =

- Village
- Location within Serbia
- Coordinates: 43°07′N 20°09′E
- Country: Serbia
- District: Zlatibor District
- Municipality: Sjenica

Population (2002)
  - Total: 47
- Time zone: UTC+1 (CET)
  - Summer (DST): UTC+2 (CEST)

Krnja Jela (Serbian Cyrillic: Крња Јела) is a village in the municipality of Sjenica, Serbia. According to the 2002 census, the village has a population of 47 people.

== History ==
Krnja Jela was first mentioned in written records in 1571. In the 1921 census, where it is listed as part of Buđevo, the village recorded 43 inhabitants across 15 households. Between the end of World War II and 1964, Krnja Jela was considered a zaseok (hamlet) of Tuzinje.

Residents of Krnja Jela were historically farmers in agriculture or animal husbandry. The village received a macadam road in 1967, followed by connection to the electric grind in 1972, with a telephone line being built in 2006. As of 2015, Krnja Jela had ten households, most part of the Turković tribe, with any children attending school in Karajukića Bunari.

The inhabitants are Bosniaks, some of whom trace their roots to Bihor, Montenegro while others have Albanian ancestors belonging to the Klimenti tribe from the 18th century. In the 1991 census, 69 of 70 residents were Muslim, while the remaining one was Orthodox.
