= Bioc =

Bioc may refer to:

- Bioc (village)
- Malonyl-CoA O-methyltransferase, an enzyme
