= Bozov =

Bozov may refer to:

- Božov Potok, a village in Serbia
- Yordan Bozov (born 1979), Bulgarian basketball player

== See also ==
- Bozova
