= Tuzinje =

Tuzinje Тузиње
- Village
- Location within Serbia
- Coordinates: 43°07′N 20°07′E
- Country: Serbia
- District: Zlatibor District
- Municipality: Sjenica

Population (2002)
  - Total: 204
- Time zone: UTC+1 (CET)
  - Summer (DST): UTC+2 (CEST)

Mosque in Tuzinje

Tuzinje (Serbian Cyrillic: Тузиње; Albanian: Tuzija) is a village in the municipality of Sjenica, Serbia. According to the 2002 census, the village has a population of 204 people.

== History ==
Like Ugao and other villages in Pešter, Tuzinje is mainly inhabited by brotherhoods descended from the Kelmendi fis. The Kurtanovići descend from the Pljakići(Plakaj) of Ugao. The village itself was founded by the Camovići (Camaj) another Kelmendi brotherhood from Tuzi Municipality (hence the name Tuzinje) The bulk of the Kelmendi arrived in Sandžak when they were expelled by their mountainous home region in Malësia e Madhe by the Ottomans as a means to control them (late 17th/early 18th century). At the time of the foundation of several settlements they were Roman Catholics and later converted to Islam, hence in these villages like in Tuzinje, there usually is a Latinsko groblje (Latin cemetery) close to the proper Muslim cemetery used by the villages.

Almost all locals identify themselves as Bosniaks and Muslims (2002 census).

== Sources ==
- Novakov, Dragana; Škrijelj, Redžep (2021). "Из антропонимије неких насеља на Пештеру на старим нишанима (XVIII и XIX век)". Зборник Радова Филозофског Факултета. 51 (2): 87–115. doi:10.5937/zrffp51-29623.
