= Sugubine =

- Village
- Location within Serbia
- Coordinates: 43°22′N 20°03′E
- Country: Serbia
- District: Zlatibor District
- Municipality: Sjenica

Area
  - Total: 8.52 km^{2} (3.29 sq mi)

Population (2002)
  - Total: 183
  - Density: 21.5/km^{2} (55.6/sq mi)
- Time zone: UTC+1 (CET)
  - Summer (DST): UTC+2 (CEST)

Sugubine is a village in the municipality of Sjenica, Serbia. According to the 2002 census, the village has a population of 183 people.
