= Ursule (Sjenica) =

Ursule Урсуле
- Village
- Location within Serbia
- Coordinates: 43°23′26″N 19°59′21″E
- Country: Serbia
- District: Zlatibor District
- Municipality: Sjenica

Area
  - Total: 18.38 km^{2} (7.10 sq mi)

Population (2002)
  - Total: 326
  - Density: 17.7/km^{2} (45.9/sq mi)
- Time zone: UTC+1 (CET)
  - Summer (DST): UTC+2 (CEST)

Ursule is a village in the municipality of Sjenica, Serbia. According to the 2002 census, the village has a population of 326 people.
