= Šušure =

Šušure Шушуре
- Interactive map of Šušure
- Coordinates: 43°16.45′N 19°54.55′E
- Country: Serbia
- District: Zlatibor

Population (2011 census)
  - Town: 25
- Time zone: UTC+1 (CET)
  - Summer (DST): UTC+2 (CEST)
- Area code: +381
- Car plates: NP

Šušure (Serbian Cyrillic: Шушуре), is a village in Serbia, located in the municipality of Sjenica, district of Zlatibor. In 2002, it had 25 inhabitants, all Serbs.

== See also ==
- List of cities, towns and villages in Serbia (N-Z)
- List of cities in Serbia
