= Fijulj =

- Village
- Location within Serbia
- Coordinates: 43°20′N 20°04′E
- Country: Serbia
- District: Zlatibor District
- Municipality: Sjenica

Area
  - Total: 17.03 km^{2} (6.58 sq mi)

Population (2002)
  - Total: 103
  - Density: 6.05/km^{2} (15.7/sq mi)
- Time zone: UTC+1 (CET)
  - Summer (DST): UTC+2 (CEST)

Fijulj is a village in the municipality of Sjenica, Serbia. According to the 2002 census, the village has a population of 103 people.
