= Koznik (Sjenica) =

Coordinates: 43°16′N 20°16′E

- Village
- Interactive map of Koznik (Sjenica)
- Country: Serbia
- District: Zlatibor District
- Municipality: Sjenica

Population (2002)
  - Total: 27
- Time zone: UTC+1 (CET)
  - Summer (DST): UTC+2 (CEST)

Koznik is a village in the municipality of Sjenica, Serbia. According to the 2002 census, the village has a population of 27 people.
