= Petrovo Polje (Sjenica) =

Coordinates: 43°12′11″N 20°14′55″E

Petrovo Polje Петрово Поље
- Village
- Interactive map of Petrovo Polje
- Country: Serbia
- District: Zlatibor District
- Municipality: Sjenica

Population (2002)
  - Total: 22
- Time zone: UTC+1 (CET)
  - Summer (DST): UTC+2 (CEST)

Petrovo Polje (Serbian Cyrillic: Петрово Поље) is a village in the municipality of Sjenica, Serbia. According to the 2002 census, the village has a population of 22 people.
