= Dujke =

- Village
- Location within Serbia
- Coordinates: 43°12′N 20°03′E
- Country: Serbia
- District: Zlatibor District
- Municipality: Sjenica

Area
  - Total: 29.55 km^{2} (11.41 sq mi)

Population (2002)
  - Total: 152
  - Density: 5.14/km^{2} (13.3/sq mi)
- Time zone: UTC+1 (CET)
  - Summer (DST): UTC+2 (CEST)

Dujke is a village in the municipality of Sjenica, Serbia. According to the 2002 census, the village has a population of 152 people.
