= Kladnica =

Kladnica Кладница
- Village
- Location within Serbia
- Coordinates: 43°23′N 20°01′E
- Country: Serbia
- District: Zlatibor District
- Municipality: Sjenica

Area
  - Total: 13.63 km^{2} (5.26 sq mi)

Population (2002)
  - Total: 362
  - Density: 26.6/km^{2} (68.8/sq mi)
- Time zone: UTC+1 (CET)
  - Summer (DST): UTC+2 (CEST)

Kladnica is a village in the municipality of Sjenica, Serbia. According to the 2002 census, the village has a population of 362 people.
