= Salih Uglla Peshteri =

Albanian performer of epic poetry

Salih Uglla Peshteri (Bosnian: Salih Ugljanin) was an Albanian performer of epic poetry (Albanian: lahutar or rapsod) from Ugao, in Pešter a sparsely populated region near Sjenica, modern day Sandžak.

== Life ==
According to Robert Elsie, Salih Uglla Peshteri was born in 1866. According to Albanian sources he was a Catholic Albanian from the tribe of Kelmendi while Parry believes he was a Muslim Albanian from Shkodër. Up to the age of 30, he sang only in Albanian but began singing in Bosnian after he married a Bosnian woman. Uglla was able to sing in both languages for hours making him a popular lahutar. In 1934 he sang the "Song of Baghdad" in Novi Pazar and it is believed that this song was taught to him by another bard.
