= Žitniće =

- Village
- Location within Serbia
- Coordinates: 43°13′N 20°09′E
- Country: Serbia
- District: Zlatibor District
- Municipality: Sjenica

Area
  - Total: 16.93 km^{2} (6.54 sq mi)

Population (2002)
  - Total: 536
  - Density: 31.7/km^{2} (82.0/sq mi)
- Time zone: UTC+1 (CET)
  - Summer (DST): UTC+2 (CEST)

Žitniće is a village in the municipality of Sjenica, Serbia. According to the 2002 census, the village has a population of 536 people.
