= Poda (Sjenica) =

- Village
- Interactive map of Poda (Sjenica)
- Coordinates: 43°3′N 20°2′E
- Country: Serbia
- District: Zlatibor District
- Municipality: Sjenica

Area
  - Total: 9.51 km^{2} (3.67 sq mi)

Population (2002)
  - Total: 17
  - Density: 1.8/km^{2} (4.6/sq mi)
- Time zone: UTC+1 (CET)
  - Summer (DST): UTC+2 (CEST)

Poda is a village in the municipality of Sjenica, Serbia. According to the 2002 census, the village has a population of 17 people. It is located southwest of Pešter.
