= Kamešnica (Sjenica) =

Kamešnica Камешница
- Village
- Location within Serbia
- Coordinates: 43°12′N 20°11′E
- Country: Serbia
- District: Zlatibor District
- Municipality: Sjenica

Area
  - Total: 25.44 km^{2} (9.82 sq mi)

Population (2002)
  - Total: 442
  - Density: 17.4/km^{2} (45.0/sq mi)
- Time zone: UTC+1 (CET)
  - Summer (DST): UTC+2 (CEST)

Kamešnica is a village in the municipality of Sjenica, Serbia. According to the 2002 census, the village has a population of 442 people.
