= Jezero (Sjenica) =

Coordinates: 43°08′N 19°50′E

Jezero (Sjenica) 36315 Bare
- Village
- Interactive map of Jezero (Sjenica)
- Country: Serbia
- District: Zlatibor District
- Municipality: Sjenica

Population (2002)
  - Total: 24
- Time zone: UTC+1 (CET)
  - Summer (DST): UTC+2 (CEST)

Jezero (Sjenica) is a village in the municipality of Sjenica, Serbia. According to the 2002 census, the village has a population of 24 people.
