= Boroviće (Sjenica) =

- Village
- Location within Serbia
- Coordinates: 43°24′N 20°00′E
- Country: Serbia
- District: Zlatibor District
- Municipality: Sjenica

Area
  - Total: 2.23 km^{2} (0.86 sq mi)

Population (2002)
  - Total: 73
  - Density: 33/km^{2} (85/sq mi)
- Time zone: UTC+1 (CET)
  - Summer (DST): UTC+2 (CEST)

Boroviće is a village in the municipality of Sjenica, Serbia. According to the 2002 census, the village has a population of 73 people.
