= Ugao =

Ugao Угао Ugëll
- Village
- Location within Serbia
- Coordinates: 43°03′N 20°03′E
- Country: Serbia
- District: Zlatibor District
- Municipality: Sjenica

Area
  - Total: 27.64 km^{2} (10.67 sq mi)
- Elevation: 1,269 m (4,163 ft)

Population (2011)
  - Total: 545
  - Density: 19.7/km^{2} (51.1/sq mi)
- Time zone: UTC+1 (CET)
  - Summer (DST): UTC+2 (CEST)

Wiki.Ras IV Džamija (Ugao) 04.jpg

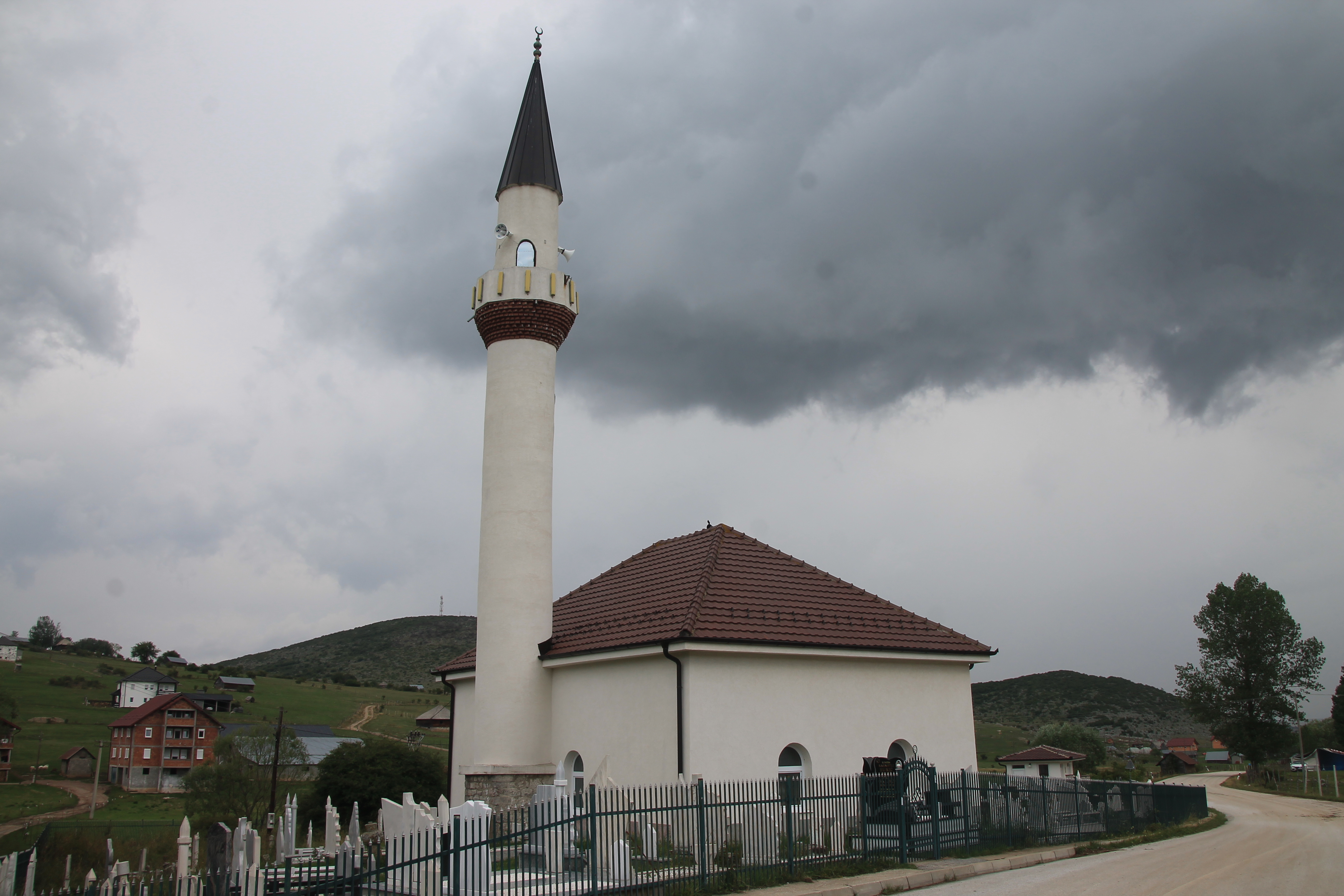
Ugao Mosque

Ugao (Serbian Cyrillic: Угао; Albanian: Uglla/Ugëll) is a village located in the municipality of Sjenica, southwestern Serbia. According to the 2011 census, the village has a population of 545 inhabitants.

Ugao is one of three Albanian villages (Boroštica, Doliće and Ugao) in the Pešter region. These villages were founded by the Kelmendi fis (tribe). After 1912, inhabitants of these villages were forced to add the suffix -ić to their surnames under the new Serbian/Yugoslav state administration. Factors such as some intermarriage undertaken by two generations with the surrounding Bosniak population along with the difficult circumstances of the Yugoslav wars (1990s) made local Albanians opt to refer to themselves in censuses as Bosniaks. Elders in the village still have a degree of fluency in the language.

== Notable people ==
- Muamer Hukić - German professional kick-boxer
- Salih Uglla Peshteri - Performer of epic poetry
