= Žabren =

- Village
- Location within Serbia
- Coordinates: 43°11′N 20°16′E
- Country: Serbia
- District: Zlatibor District
- Municipality: Sjenica

Area
  - Total: 23.28 km^{2} (8.99 sq mi)

Population (2002)
  - Total: 321
  - Density: 13.8/km^{2} (35.7/sq mi)
- Time zone: UTC+1 (CET)
  - Summer (DST): UTC+2 (CEST)

Žabren is a village in the municipality of Sjenica, Serbia. According to the 2002 census, the village has a population of 321 people.
