= Ponorac =

- Village
- Location within Serbia
- Coordinates: 43°22′N 20°01′E
- Country: Serbia
- District: Zlatibor District
- Municipality: Sjenica

Area
  - Total: 10.66 km^{2} (4.12 sq mi)

Population (2002)
  - Total: 186
  - Density: 17.4/km^{2} (45.2/sq mi)
- Time zone: UTC+1 (CET)
  - Summer (DST): UTC+2 (CEST)

Ponorac is a village in the municipality of Sjenica, Serbia. According to the 2002 census, the village has a population of 186 people.
