= Blato (Sjenica) =

- Village
- Location within Serbia
- Coordinates: 43°09′N 19°50′E
- Country: Serbia
- District: Zlatibor District
- Municipality: Sjenica

Population (2002)
  - Total: 65
- Time zone: UTC+1 (CET)
  - Summer (DST): UTC+2 (CEST)

Blato is a village in the municipality of Sjenica, Serbia. As of the 2002 census, the village had a population of 65 people.
