= Grgaje =

- Village
- Location within Serbia
- Coordinates: 43°06′N 19°53′E
- Country: Serbia
- District: Zlatibor District
- Municipality: Sjenica

Population (2002)
  - Total: 87
- Time zone: UTC+1 (CET)
  - Summer (DST): UTC+2 (CEST)

Grgaje is a village in the municipality of Sjenica, Serbia. According to the 2002 census, the village has a population of 87 people.
