= Zabrđe (Sjenica) =

- Village
- Location within Serbia
- Coordinates: 43°07′N 19°53′E
- Country: Serbia
- District: Zlatibor District
- Municipality: Sjenica

Area
  - Total: 1.20 km^{2} (0.46 sq mi)

Population (2002)
  - Total: 50
  - Density: 42/km^{2} (110/sq mi)
- Time zone: UTC+1 (CET)
  - Summer (DST): UTC+2 (CEST)

Zabrđe is a village in the municipality of Sjenica, Serbia. According to the 2002 census, the village has a population of 50 people.
