= Kijevci, Sjenica =

Kijevci Кијевци
- Village
- Location within Serbia
- Coordinates: 43°41′48″N 21°54′14″E
- Country: Serbia
- Region: Šumadija and Western Serbia
- District: Zlatibor
- Municipality: Sjenica

Area
  - Total: 13.02 km^{2} (5.03 sq mi)
- Elevation: 1,113 m (3,652 ft)

Population (2011)
  - Total: 225
  - Density: 17.3/km^{2} (44.8/sq mi)
- Time zone: UTC+1 (CET)
  - Summer (DST): UTC+2 (CEST)

Kijevci is a village in the municipality of Sjenica, Serbia. According to the 2011 census, the village has a population of 225 inhabitants.

== Population ==
Population of Kijevci
| 1948 | 1953 | 1961 | 1971 | 1981 | 1991 | 2002 | 2011 |
| 338 | 361 | 418 | 340 | 288 | 233 | 151 | 225 |
