= Trijebine =

Trijebine Тријебине
- Village
- Location within Serbia
- Coordinates: 43°12′N 19°55′E
- Country: Serbia
- District: Zlatibor District
- Municipality: Sjenica

Area
  - Total: 51.92 km^{2} (20.05 sq mi)

Population (2002)
  - Total: 397
  - Density: 7.65/km^{2} (19.8/sq mi)
- Time zone: UTC+1 (CET)
  - Summer (DST): UTC+2 (CEST)

Trijebine is a village in the municipality of Sjenica, Serbia. According to the 2002 census, the village has a population of 397 people.
