= Kalipolje =

- Village
- Location within Serbia
- Coordinates: 43°25′07″N 20°01′52″E
- Country: Serbia
- District: Zlatibor District
- Municipality: Sjenica

Area
  - Total: 0.59 km^{2} (0.23 sq mi)

Population (2002)
  - Total: 21
  - Density: 36/km^{2} (92/sq mi)
- Time zone: UTC+1 (CET)
  - Summer (DST): UTC+2 (CEST)

Kalipolje is a village in the municipality of Sjenica, Serbia. According to the 2002 census, the village has a population of 21 people.
