= Crvsko =

- Village
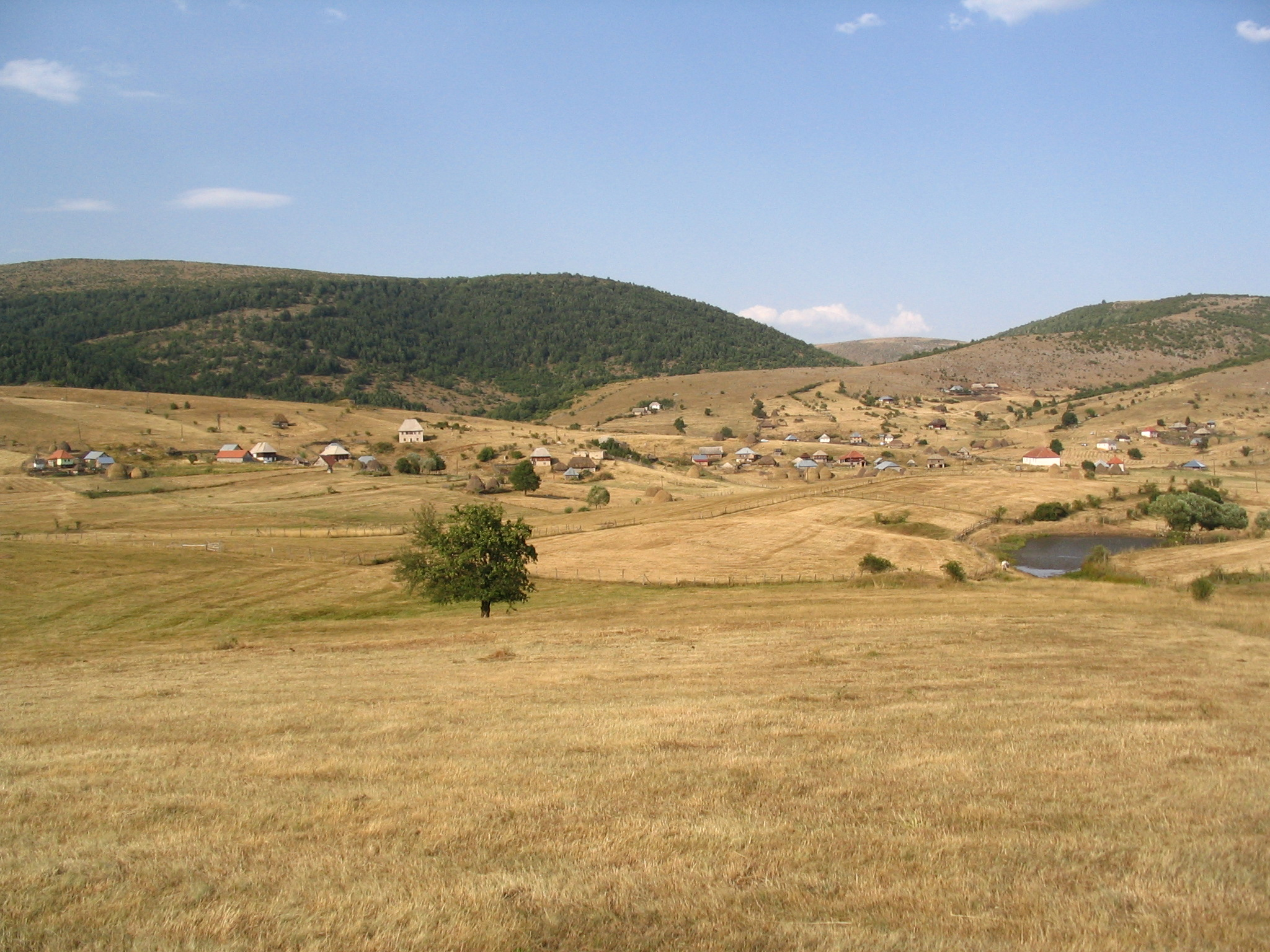
- Panoramic view of Crvsko, Serbia.

- Location within Serbia
- Coordinates: 43°06′N 19°54′E
- Country: Serbia
- District: Zlatibor District
- Municipality: Sjenica

Area
  - Total: 38.53 km^{2} (14.88 sq mi)

Population (2002)
  - Total: 140
  - Density: 3.6/km^{2} (9.4/sq mi)
- Time zone: UTC+1 (CET)
  - Summer (DST): UTC+2 (CEST)

Crvsko is a village in the municipality of Sjenica, Serbia. According to the 2002 census, the village has a population of 140 people.
