= Aliveroviće =

Village in Serbia

Coordinates: 43°09′N 20°10′E

- Village
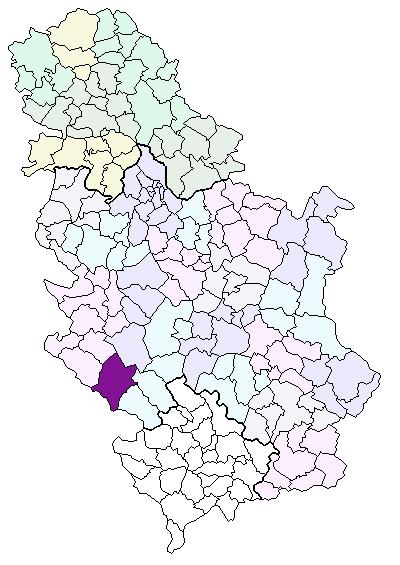
- Location of the municipality of Sjenica in Serbia

- Location within Serbia
- Country: Serbia
- District: Zlatibor District
- Municipality: Sjenica

Population (2002)
  - Total: 157
- Time zone: UTC+1 (CET)
  - Summer (DST): UTC+2 (CEST)

Aliveroviće (Serbian: Аливеровиће, is a village in Serbia located in the municipality of Sjenica, district of Zlatibor. In 2002, it had 157 inhabitants, of which 154 were Bosniak (98,08%).

== History ==
In 1701 the village was made up of mostly Albanians with four families being of Catholic Albanian tribes totalling 41 people.

== See also ==
=== Other articles ===
- List of cities, towns and villages in Serbia
- List of settlements in Serbia (alphabetic)
