= Sjenica =

Sjenica Сјеница (Serbian) Sjenica (Bosnian)
- Town and municipality
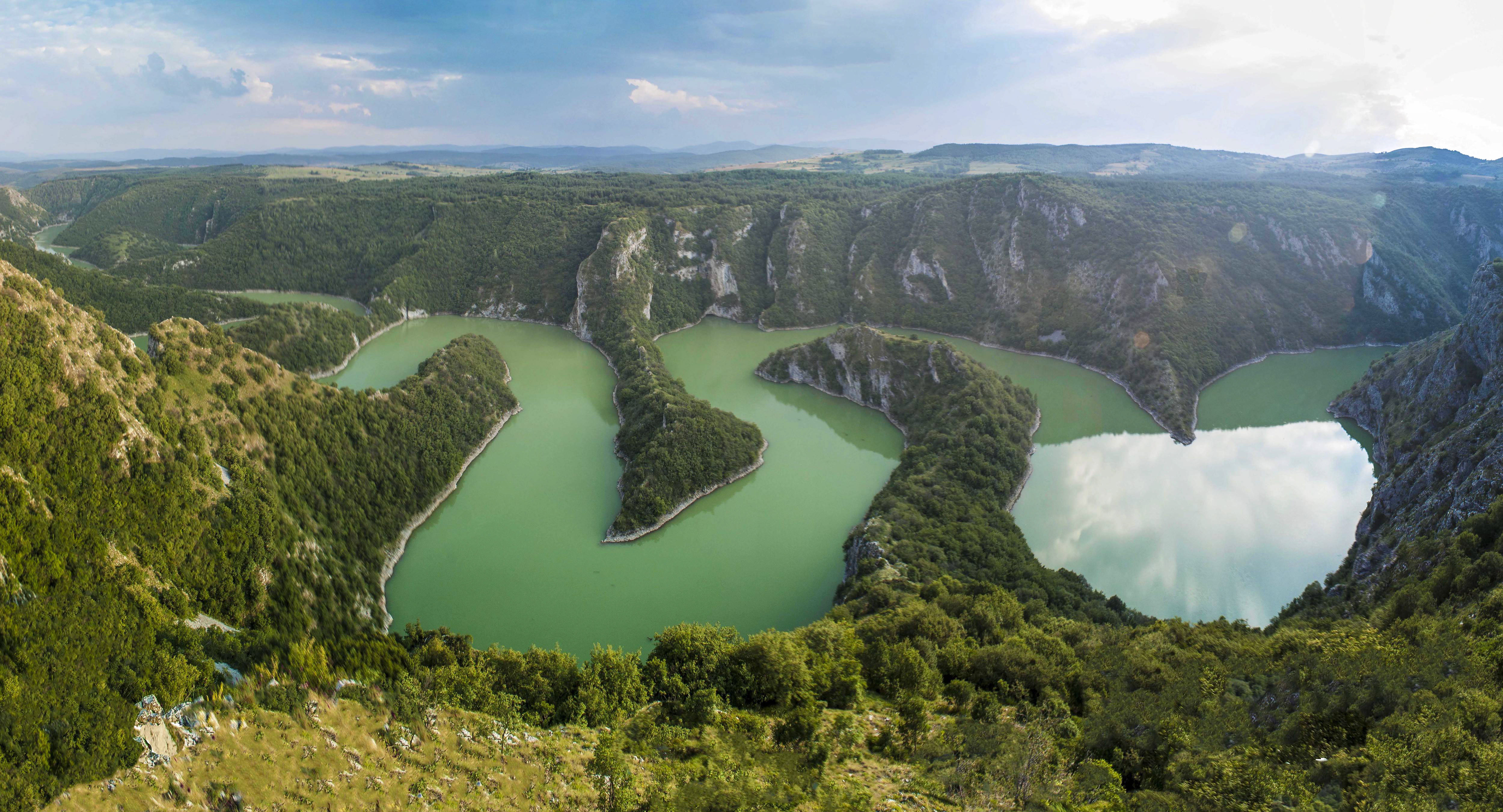
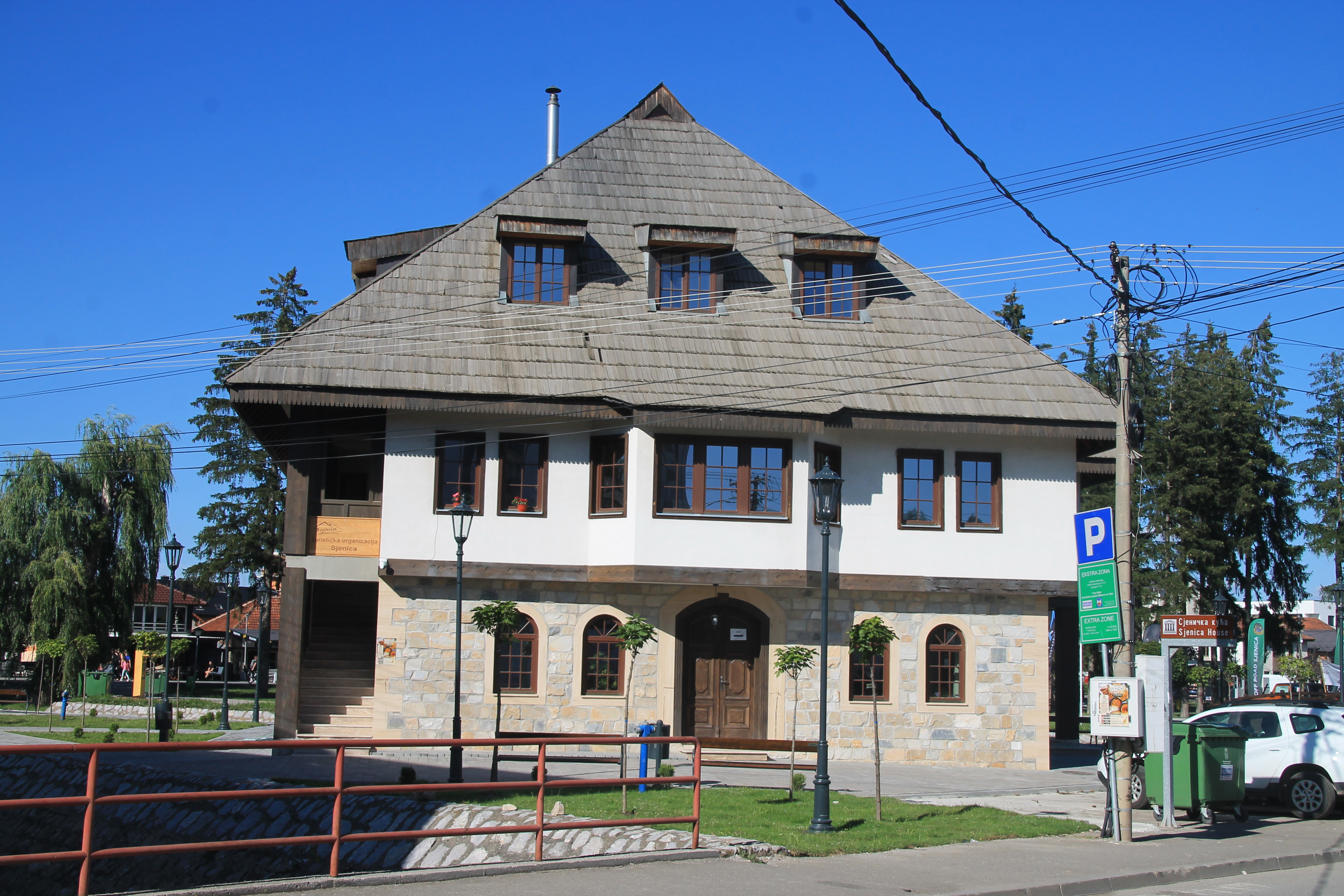
- From top: Uvac Special Nature Reserve, Sjenica house

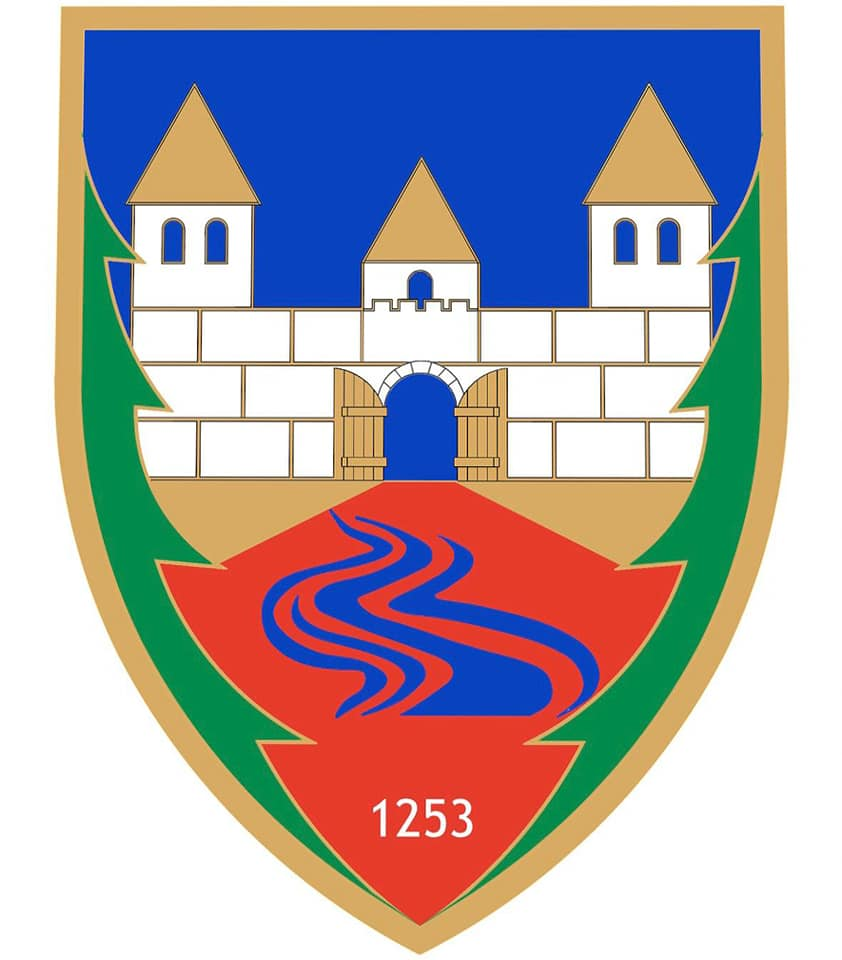
- Coat of arms

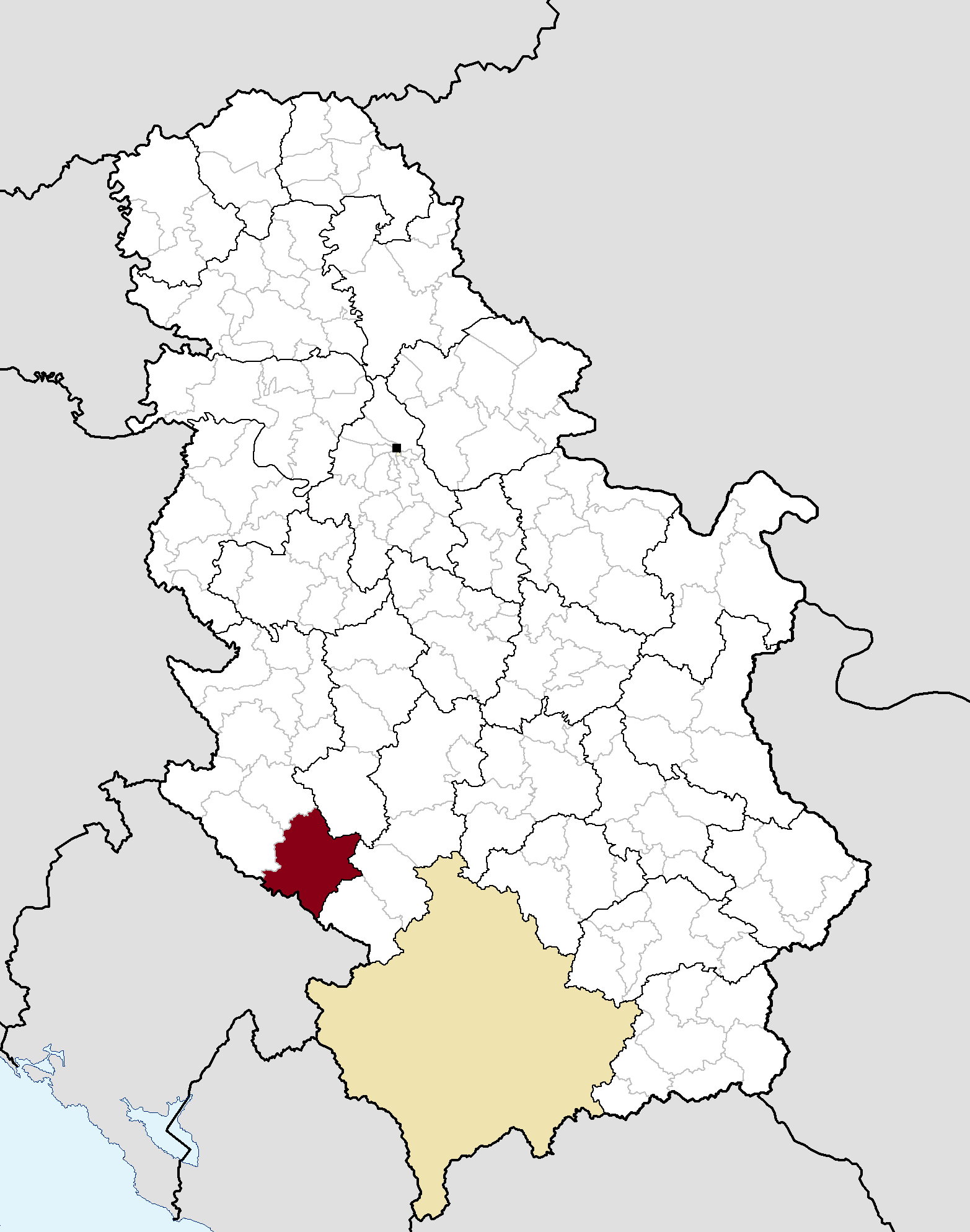
- Location of the municipality of Sjenica within Serbia
- Coordinates: 43°16′N 20°00′E
- Country: Serbia
- Region: Šumadija and Western Serbia
- District: Zlatibor
- First mentioned: 1253
- Settlements: 101

Government
  - Mayor: Munib Mujagić (SPP)

Area
  - Rank: 11th in Serbia
  - Town: 25.76 km^{2} (9.95 sq mi)
  - Municipality: 1,059 km^{2} (409 sq mi)
- Elevation: 1,026 m (3,366 ft)

Population (2022 census)
  - Rank: 65th in Serbia
  - Town: 12,989
  - Town density: 504.2/km^{2} (1,306/sq mi)
  - Municipality: 24,083
  - Municipality density: 22.74/km^{2} (58.90/sq mi)
- Time zone: UTC+1 (CET)
  - Summer (DST): UTC+2 (CEST)
- Postal code: 36310
- Area code: +381(0)20
- Car plates: SJ
- Official languages: Serbian together with Bosnian
- Website: www.sjenica.rs

Sjenica (Serbian Cyrillic: Сјеница, pronounced [sjɛ̌nitsa]) is a town and municipality located in the Zlatibor District of southwestern Serbia, on the vast Sjenica-Pešter plateau and geographically located in the central part of Sandžak. The population of the municipality, according to the 2022 census, is 24,083, while the town has a population of 12,989.

Serbia's 11th largest municipality in terms of area (1,059 km^{2}), Sjenica is a multi-ethnic environment where Bosniaks, Serbs, Albanians, Montenegrins, Turks, Romani and others live.

According to the level of development of local self-government units for the year 2014, the municipality of Sjenica belongs to the fourth group, consisting of 44 extremely underdeveloped local self-government units whose level of development is below 60% of the national average.

== History ==
The Sjenica area has been inhabited since prehistoric times. The remains of a prehistoric fortification were found on the edge of the Sjenica field, on the Zarudina hill, near Sjenica, and in several locations near Sjenica, necropolises were discovered and objects from the prehistoric period were found. In this, as well as in a wider area, lived the Dardanians, who were later driven to the south by the Illyrian tribe, Autariat.

Sjenica was first mentioned in 1253 as a place on the road to Dubrovnik, where merchants from Dubrovnik stopped and paid customs.

=== 15th century ===
In the first decades under the Ottomans (15th century), Sjenica was a vilayet and nahija of the same name as part of the Sanjak of Bosnia, that is, one of the hass of the Skopje-Bosnian sandžak-bey and Isa Bey Ishaković, son of Ishak Bey. Ottoman defteri (census books) from that period (from 1455) say that part of the Sjenica area was part of the then Branković District.

During the reign of the Ottoman Empire, Sjenica was used as a fortified site. On a nearby hill the Ottomans built a fortress, which was later demolished. Next to the fortress was a merchants' quarter and few wooden residential homes.

=== 18th, 19th and 20th centuries ===
From 1790 to 1817, Sjenica was one of the 5 districts of the newly formed Novopazarski Sandžak: Novi Pazar, Stari Vlah (Nova Varoš), Sjenica, Mitrovica and Trgovište. In 1835, Sjenica was mentioned as the center of the Novopazarski Sandžak.

Due to its strategic, military and political importance, during the 19th century Sjenica was considered an important destination, so military and other operations were directed towards it, in which a large number of the local population died on several occasions.

A Bulgarian foreign ministry reported that Sjenica had 505 Albanian houses in 1901-02. In May 1901, Albanians pillaged and partially burned the cities of Novi Pazar, Sjenica and Pristina, and massacred Serbs in the area of Ibar Kolašin.

After the First Balkan War, the Sjenica region became part of the Kingdom of Serbia. Sjenica became the center of the county of the same name, which had 26,381 inhabitants and included 12 municipalities, 80 villages, 44 hamlets and one borough (Sjenica). In 1917 when the area was under Austrian control a conference was held, in which the representatives drafted and signed a resolution for the union of the area with Bosnia or the establishment of an autonomous region.

From 1929 to 1941, Sjenica was part of the Zeta Banovina of the Kingdom of Yugoslavia. During World War II the SS Polizei-Selbstschutz-Regiment Sandschak under Karl von Krempler was stationed here consisted of local Muslim population, during a period when many Serbs lost their lives. In 1943 Sjenica was the battleground of intense fighting between Partisans and the German army.

== Geography ==
Sjenica is located at an altitude of 1,026 meters above sea level, making it one of the highest towns in Serbia and the Balkans. Temperatures fall below freezing on average 134 days per year, with the first freeze in late September and the last in early May.

According to the Köppen-Geiger climate classification, it has a humid continental climate (Dfb) with freezing and not so humid winters, and with warm and humid summers, but with cold nights. The town itself extends on the right side of the Uvac river and is located along the Grabovica river, in the spacious Sjenica basin, at an altitude of 1,000-1,030 m above sea level.

In terms of area (1,059 km^{2}), Sjenica is one of the largest municipalities in Serbia. The Sjenički region is located in the mountainous surroundings of Golija (1,833 m), Jadovnik (1,733 m), Ozren (1,693 m), Zlatar (1,625 m), Giljeva (1,617 m), Žilindar (1,616 m), Javor (1,519 m), Ninaja (1,362 m), Jaruta (1,428 m) and other mountain ranges, on the one hand, and the spacious valleys of Sjenica, Pešter (Ugljan), Koštan and other fields.

It borders the municipalities of Bijelo Polje (Montenegro), Prijepolje, Tutin, Novi Pazar, Ivanjica and Nova Varoš. The area of the Sjenica-Pešter Plateau abounds in extremely large natural potentials, suitable especially for the development of agriculture and animal husbandry, as well as significant mineral wealth (large deposits of brown - lignite coal).

Sjenica has a large number of ski slopes, as well as the National Biathlon Center Žari.

Of the other potentials, the Uvac, Gutavica and Paljevine nature reserves, Sjenica lake, the large Peštersko polje, the Uša cave system, Tubića cave, Baždarska cave, meanders of the Vapa river, as well as numerous archaeological sites and localities stand out.

=== Climate ===
Sjenica has a microtermal warm-summer humid continental climate (Köppen Dfb). In addition to its other specifics, Sjenica is known in Europe as one of the coldest inhabited places. Winters in Sjenica are long and cold, and low temperatures can sometimes last for days (in January 2005, the unofficial lowest temperature in Serbia was recorded in Sjenica, −42°C).

Officially, the lowest measured temperature in Sjenica municipality, −39°C, was recorded on 26 January 2006 in Krajukića Bunari. In Sjenica town, on 26 January 1954, −38.4°C was measured.

Climate data for Sjenica, Serbia (1991–2020, extremes 1961–2020)
Month	Jan	Feb	Mar	Apr	May	Jun	Jul	Aug	Sep	Oct	Nov	Dec	Year
Record high °C (°F)	17.2 (63.0)	20.6 (69.1)	21.9 (71.4)	26.8 (80.2)	30.3 (86.5)	32.2 (90.0)	34.7 (94.5)	36.2 (97.2)	33.3 (91.9)	29.1 (84.4)	27.3 (81.1)	18.0 (64.4)	36.2 (97.2)
Mean daily maximum °C (°F)	1.9 (35.4)	4.0 (39.2)	8.1 (46.6)	13.0 (55.4)	17.8 (64.0)	21.9 (71.4)	24.1 (75.4)	24.7 (76.5)	19.5 (67.1)	15.2 (59.4)	9.5 (49.1)	3.0 (37.4)	13.6 (56.5)
Daily mean °C (°F)	−3.4 (25.9)	−1.8 (28.8)	2.2 (36.0)	7.0 (44.6)	11.6 (52.9)	15.3 (59.5)	17.0 (62.6)	16.8 (62.2)	12.3 (54.1)	8.0 (46.4)	3.2 (37.8)	−2.0 (28.4)	7.2 (45.0)
Mean daily minimum °C (°F)	−7.9 (17.8)	−6.6 (20.1)	−2.8 (27.0)	1.4 (34.5)	5.3 (41.5)	8.7 (47.7)	10.0 (50.0)	9.8 (49.6)	6.5 (43.7)	2.5 (36.5)	−1.4 (29.5)	−6.1 (21.0)	1.6 (34.9)
Record low °C (°F)	−35.6 (−32.1)	−31.0 (−23.8)	−25.0 (−13.0)	−12.7 (9.1)	−6.4 (20.5)	−3.7 (25.3)	−0.4 (31.3)	−1.3 (29.7)	−9.3 (15.3)	−11.5 (11.3)	−26.2 (−15.2)	−29.6 (−21.3)	−35.6 (−32.1)
Average precipitation mm (inches)	48.3 (1.90)	53.1 (2.09)	56.6 (2.23)	57.9 (2.28)	82.6 (3.25)	79.7 (3.14)	74.7 (2.94)	63.5 (2.50)	75.9 (2.99)	71.8 (2.83)	67.8 (2.67)	64.7 (2.55)	796.6 (31.36)
Average precipitation days (≥ 0.1 mm)	14.2	14.4	14.0	14.9	16.2	14.4	12.4	11.4	13.7	13.2	12.1	15.2	166.1
Average snowy days	12.8	12.5	10.9	4.1	0.7	0.0	0.0	0.0	0.0	1.6	5.6	11.6	59.8
Average relative humidity (%)	83.5	79.9	75.9	72.2	73.0	73.3	71.7	72.1	76.5	78.6	81.1	84.4	76.9
Mean monthly sunshine hours	88.0	100.7	146.9	162.7	195.6	229.3	258.3	247.6	172.8	143.2	95.7	75.0	1,915.8
Source: Republic Hydrometeorological Service of Serbia

=== Settlements ===
Aside from the town of Sjenica, the municipality includes the following settlements:

- Aliveroviće
- Bagačiće
- Bare
- Bačija
- Bioc
- Blato
- Boguti
- Božov Potok
- Boljare
- Borišiće
- Boroviće
- Breza
- Brnjica
- Buđevo
- Vapa
- Veskoviće
- Visočka
- Višnjeva
- Višnjice
- Vrapci
- Vrbnica
- Vrsjenice
- Goluban
- Gornje Lopiže
- Goševo
- Grabovica
- Gradac
- Grgaje
- Doliće
- Donje Goračiće
- Donje Lopiže
- Dragojloviće
- Draževiće
- Družiniće
- Dubnica
- Duga Poljana
- Dujke
- Dunišiće
- Žabren
- Žitniće
- Zabrđe
- Zaječiće
- Zahumsko
- Jevik
- Jezero
- Kalipolje
- Kamešnica
- Kanjevina
- Karajukića Bunari
- Kijevci
- Kladnica
- Kneževac
- Koznik
- Kokošiće
- Krajinoviće
- Krivaja
- Krnja Jela
- Krstac
- Krće
- Lijeva Reka
- Ljutaje
- Mašoviće
- Medare
- Međugor
- Milići
- Papiće
- Petrovo Polje
- Plana
- Poda
- Ponorac
- Pralja
- Raždaginja
- Rasno
- Raspoganče
- Rastenoviće
- Raškoviće
- Skradnik
- Strajiniće
- Stup
- Sugubine
- Sušica
- Trešnjevica
- Trijebine
- Tuzinje
- Tutiće
- Uvac
- Ugao
- Ursule
- Ušak
- Fijulj
- Caričina
- Cetanoviće
- Crvsko
- Crčevo
- Čedovo
- Čipalje
- Čitluk
- Šare
- Štavalj
- Šušure

== Demography ==
Population census
Year	Pop.	±% p.a.
1948	31,980	—
1953	36,033	+2.42%
1961	36,950	+0.31%
1971	36,622	−0.09%
1981	35,570	−0.29%
1991	33,681	−0.54%
2002	27,970	−1.67%
2011	26,392	−0.64%
2022	24,083	−0.83%
Source: RZS 1948–2011, RZS 2022

According to the 2022 census, the municipality of Sjenica has a population of 24,083 inhabitants. The population density on the territory of the municipality is 23.5 inhabitants per square kilometer.

=== Ethnic groups ===
In 1991, the population of the municipality of Sjenica was 76.1% ethnic Muslims, 22.6% Serbs and Montenegrins, and 1.3% others. In the 1991 census, most of those who declared themselves as ethnic Muslims, some declared themselves as Bosniaks in the next census of 2002, while others still declared themselves as a Muslims by ethnicity.

Most of the population in Sjenica are Bosniaks or Muslims by ethnicity (77.8%), followed by Serbs (16%), and Roma (0.3%). Ethnic composition of the municipality (2022 census):

Ethnic group	Census 1991		Census 2011		Census 2022	
Ethnic group	Population	%	Population	%	Population	%
Bosniaks	-		19,498	73.9	17,665	73.4
Serbs	7,546	22.4	5,264	20	3,861	16
Muslims	25,633	76.1	1,234	4.7	1,069	4.4
Albanians	55	0.1	29	0.1	26	0.1
Montenegrins	77	0.2	15	0.0	3	0.0
Roma	1	0.0	93	0.3	1	0.0
Others	154	0.4	237	0.9	1,431	5.9
Total	33,681		26,392		24,083	

== Economy ==
As of 2023, Sjenica was one of the municipalities in Serbia with the highest unemployment rate (around 50%). Some of the main reasons for this was unstable political situation during the 1990s and 2000s, and underdeveloped infrastructure (with no international airports, motorways and railways nearby).

The following table gives a preview of total number of registered people employed in legal entities per their core activity (as of 2022):

Activity	Total
Agriculture, forestry and fishing	69
Mining and quarrying	416
Manufacturing	935
Electricity, gas, steam and air conditioning supply	43
Water supply; sewerage, waste management and remediation activities	102
Construction	166
Wholesale and retail trade, repair of motor vehicles and motorcycles	397
Transportation and storage	200
Accommodation and food services	129
Information and communication	25
Financial and insurance activities	22
Real estate activities	1
Professional, scientific and technical activities	124
Administrative and support service activities	8
Public administration and defense; compulsory social security	368
Education	706
Human health and social work activities	255
Arts, entertainment and recreation	56
Other service activities	75
Individual agricultural workers	466
Total	4,563

== Governance ==
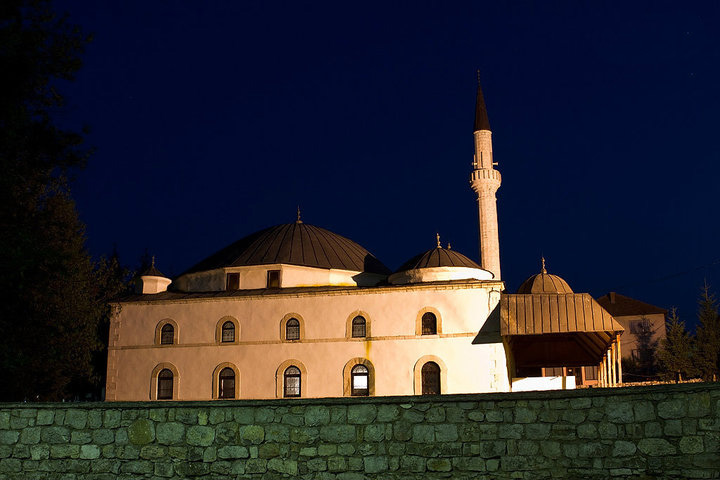

The Sjenica Municipal Assembly is the highest legislative body. As a representative body, it has exclusively political functions, adopts the municipal statute, decisions and other municipal regulations, approves the budget, budget rebalancing (if necessary) and the final budget account, development and other plans and programs, supervises the work of the head of the Municipal Administration and the administrative service, elects the assembly leadership (president, deputy president and secretary of the assembly), adopts the rules of procedure on its work, the Decision on the symbols of the municipality and performs other tasks determined by the law and the statute of the municipality.

The municipal assembly consists of councilors who are elected for a period of four years, in accordance with election regulations. In accordance with its territorial organization, the number of local communities and the number of inhabitants, the Sjenica Municipal Assembly has 39 councilors.

== Education ==
The educational system in the municipality of Sjenica covers pre-school, elementary and secondary education. The network of educational institutions in the municipality consists of one preschool institution, eight elementary schools and two secondary schools. In recent years, approximately 4,000 students attend elementary schools on average, while just under 1,000 students attend high school and technical-agricultural school.

=== Preschool ===
The preschool education system in the municipality of Sjenica consists of one public preschool institution, "Maslačak". The founder of the institution is the municipality of Sjenica. The institution has one building with a total usable area of 852 m^{2}, which includes five (5) work rooms and one (1) hall. Another facility is under construction, with a projected area of 1,826 m^{2}, with 6 work rooms and several halls.

=== Elementary ===
The elementary education system in Sjenica consists of 8 parent schools with a total of 27 separate schools. With the total of 3,043 students, there are 2 elementary schools in the town area:

- Elementary school "12. December" (elementary school in Sjenica and 4 regional schools - Bagačiće, Dunišiće, Fijulje and Vapa),
- Elementary school "Svetozar Marković" (elementary school in Sjenica and 3 district schools - Gonje, Trijebine and Lopiže).

The following elementary schools operate in the rural area:

- Elementary school "Bratstvo-jedinstvo" with headquarters (parent school) in Duga Poljana and regional schools in Žabren, Dražević, Kamešnica, Šare and Žitnić.
- Elementary school "Rifat Burdžović - Tršo" with headquarters (parent school) in Karajukića Bunari and regional schools in Rasno, Budjevo, Ugl, Dolić, Tuzinje and Cetanovići.
- Elementary school "Jovan Jovanović Zmaj" with headquarters (parent school) in Raždaginja (village Zaječiće) and district schools in Kijevci and Dujke.
- Elementary school "Vuk Karadžić" with headquarters (parent school) in Kladnica, one facility for pre-school education and regional schools in Ursula and Sugubine.
- Elementary school "Branko Radičević" with headquarters (home school) in Štavlje and regional schools in Stup, Dragojlovići and Brnjica.
- Elementary school "Sveti Sava" with headquarters (parent school) in Bari and regional schools in Vrbnica and Crvsko.

=== Secondary ===
The secondary education system in the municipality of Sjenica consists of two secondary schools: the gymnasium "Jezdimir Lović", and Technical and Agricultural School. The "Jezdimir Lović" gymnasium, based in Sjenica, started its work in 1961 as an advanced department of the gymnasium from Novi Pazar, and in 1962 it became an independent educational institution. The technical agricultural school with headquarters in Sjenica was founded in 1922 as a vocational school. Today, it trains personnel for various occupations in the fields of technical and agricultural professions.

== International relations ==
=== Twin cities ===
- Nakskov, Denmark
- Kartal, Turkey

== Gallery ==
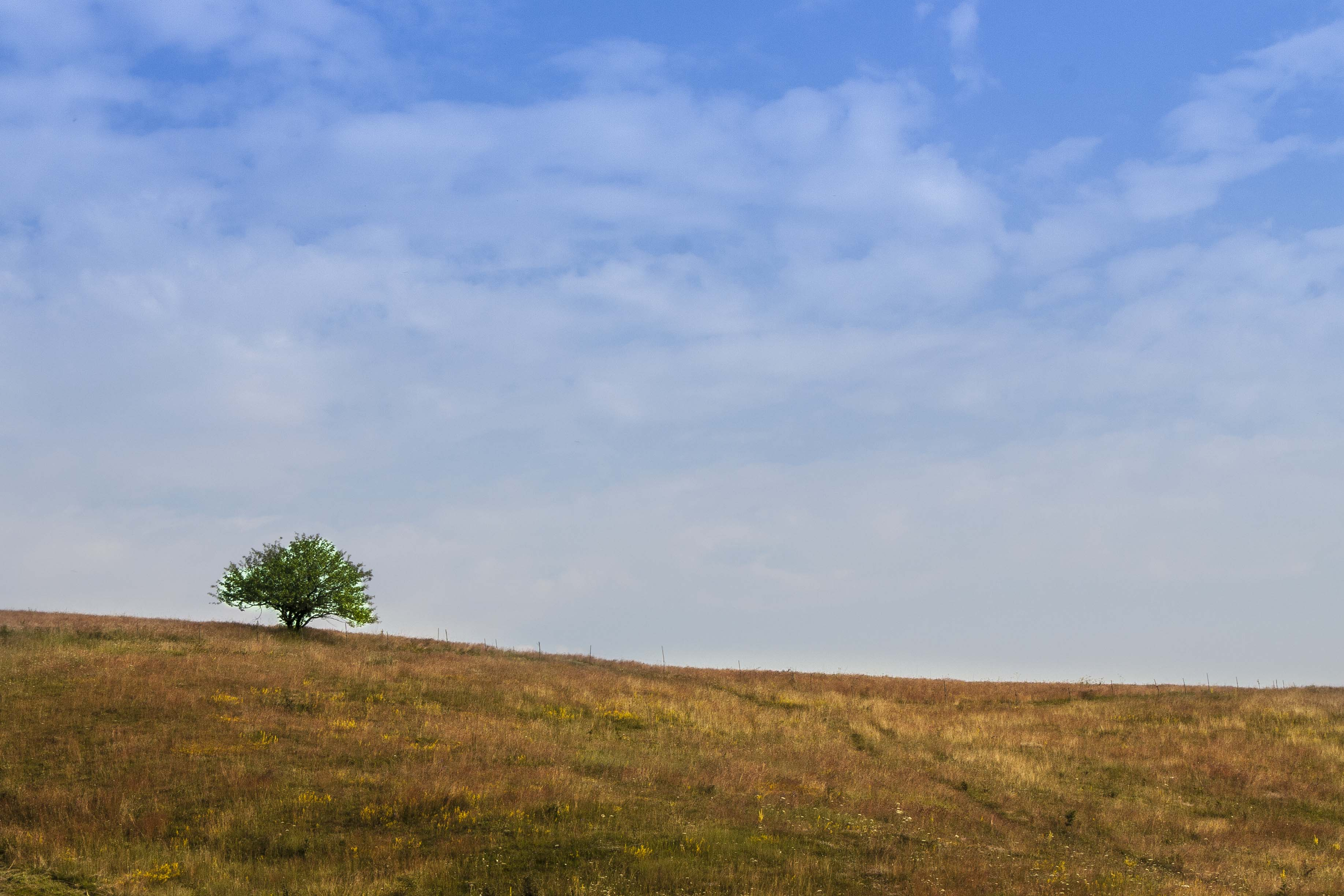
Uvac Special Nature Reserve

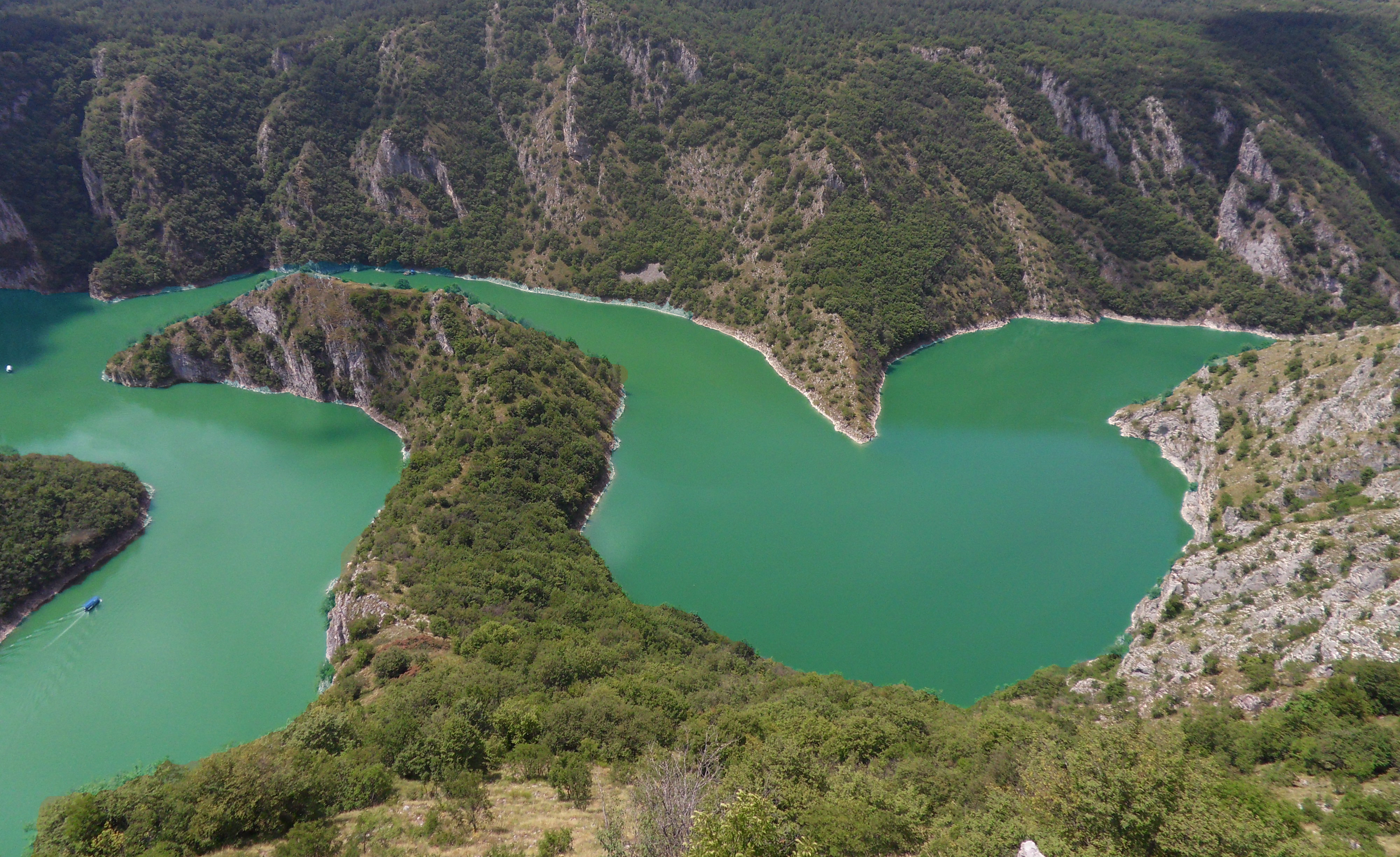
Uvac Special Nature Reserve

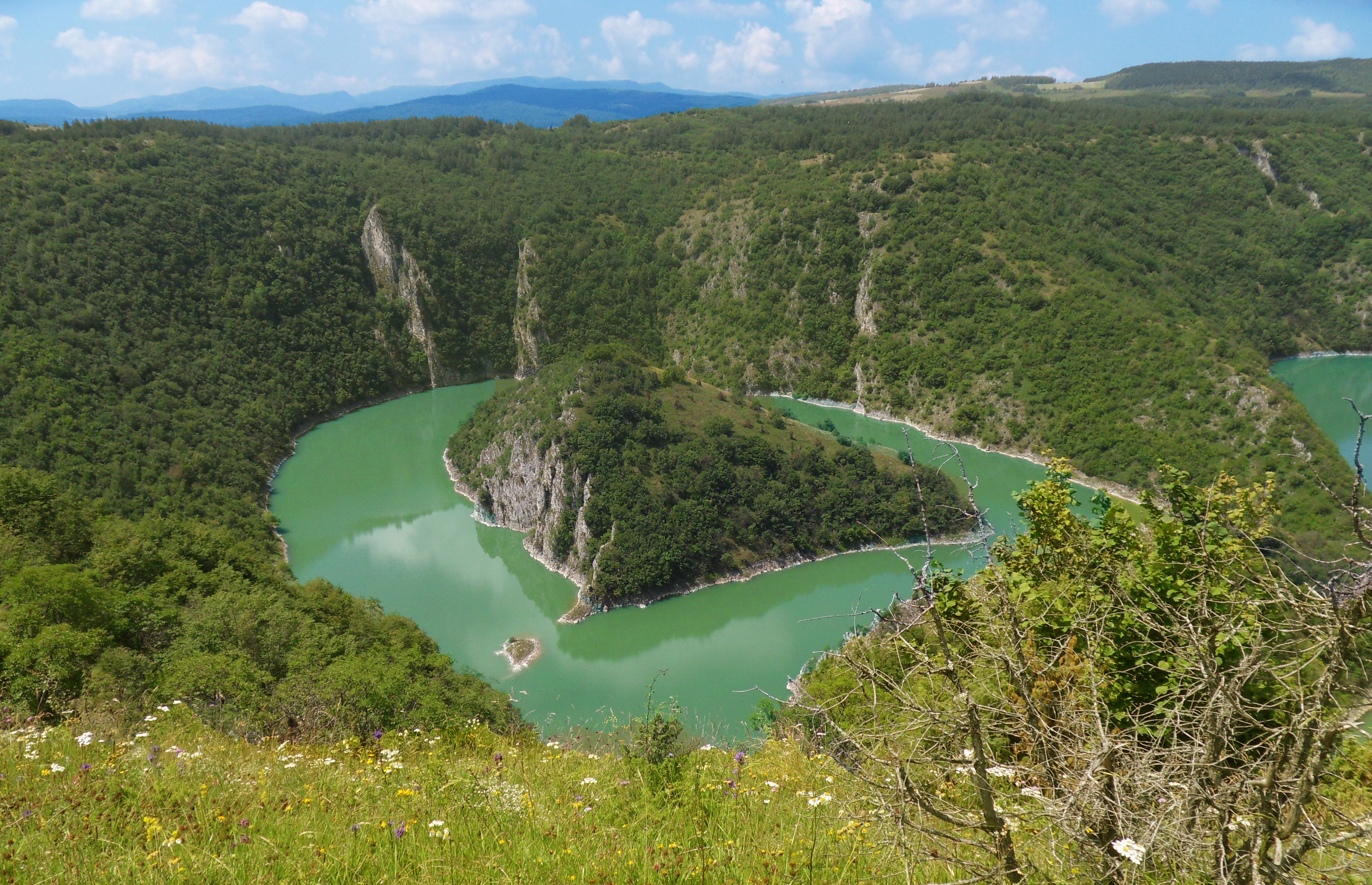
Uvac Special Nature Reserve

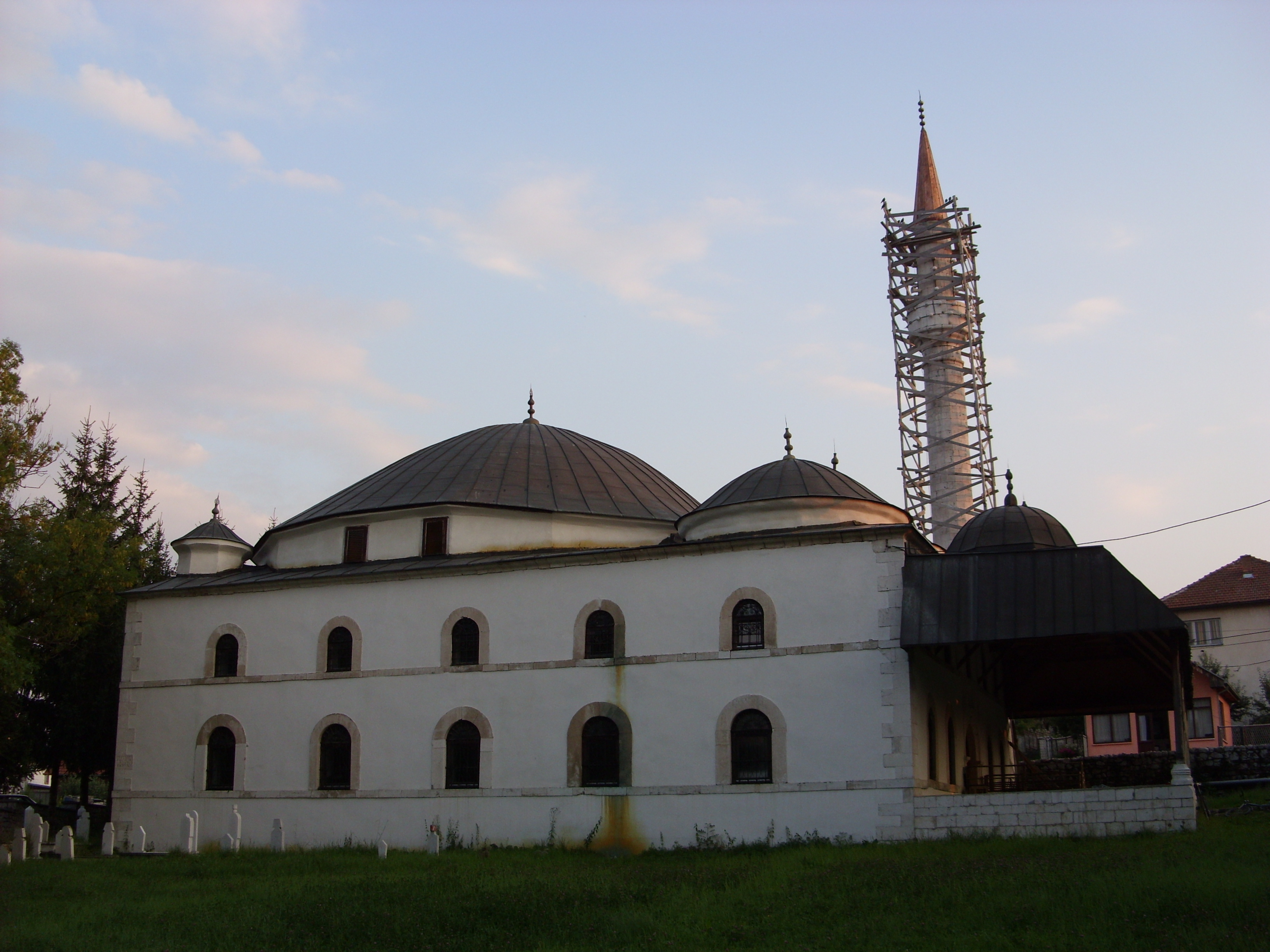
Mosque "Sultanija Valida" Sjenica

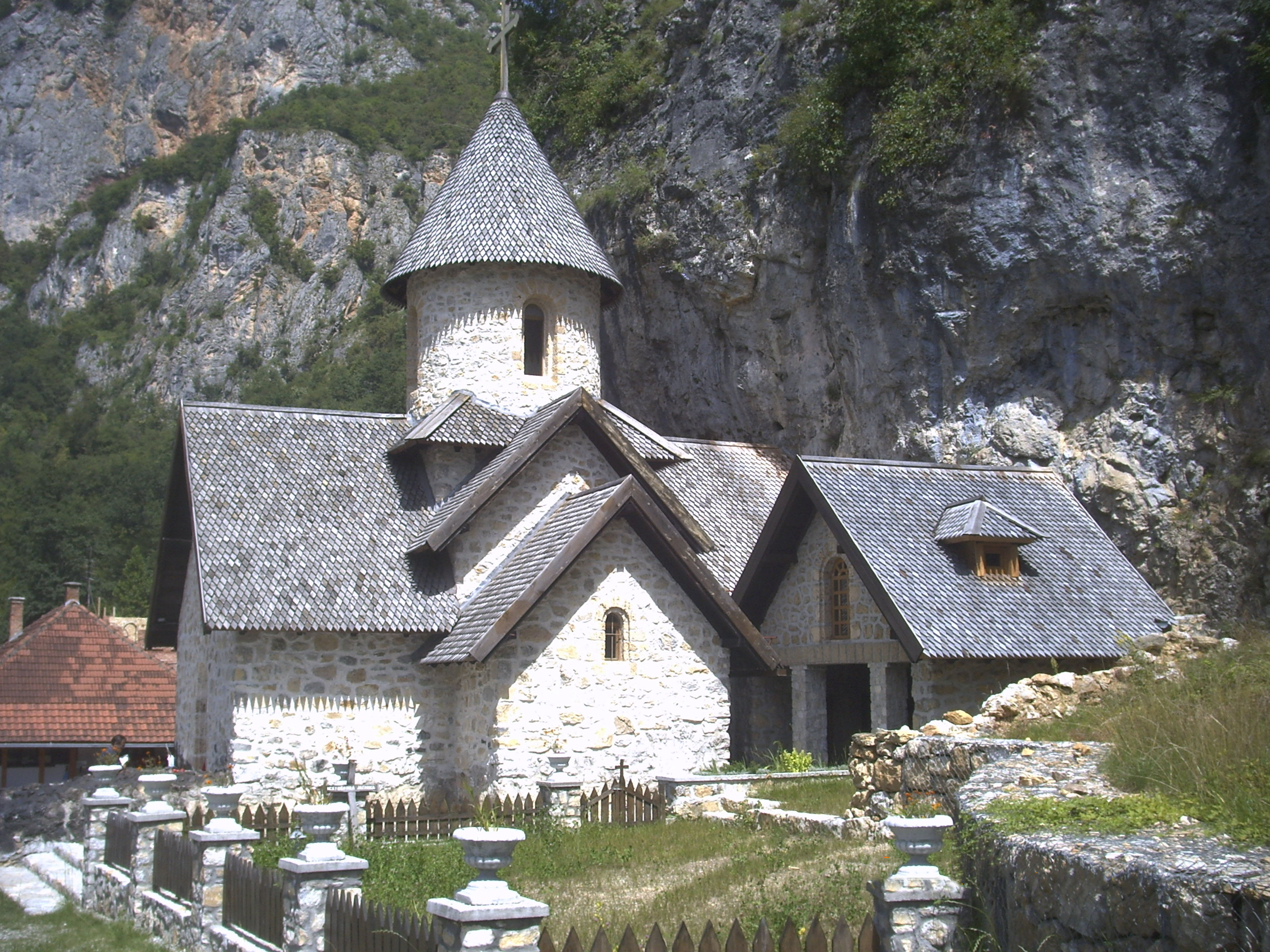
Monastery Kumanica

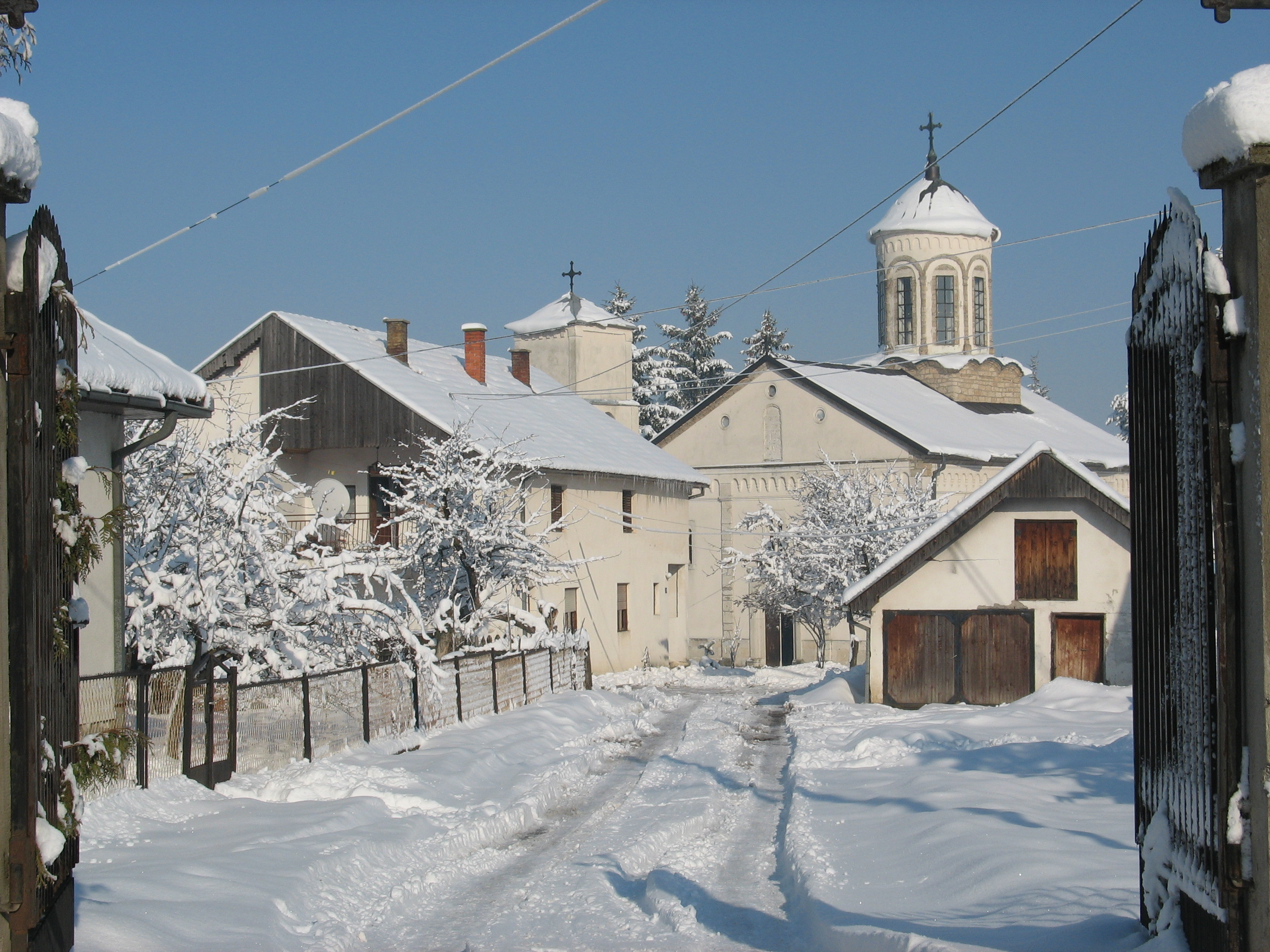
Church in Sjenica

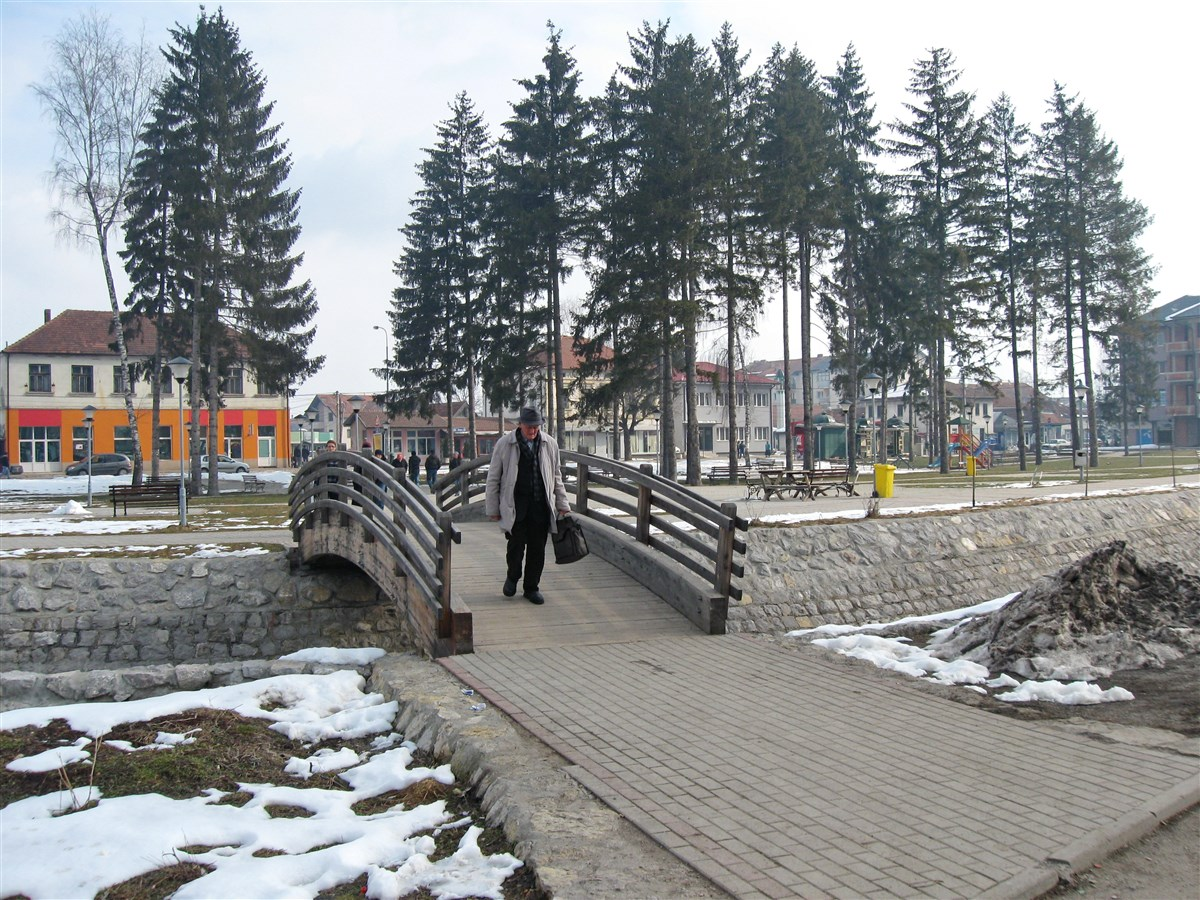
Town neighborhood

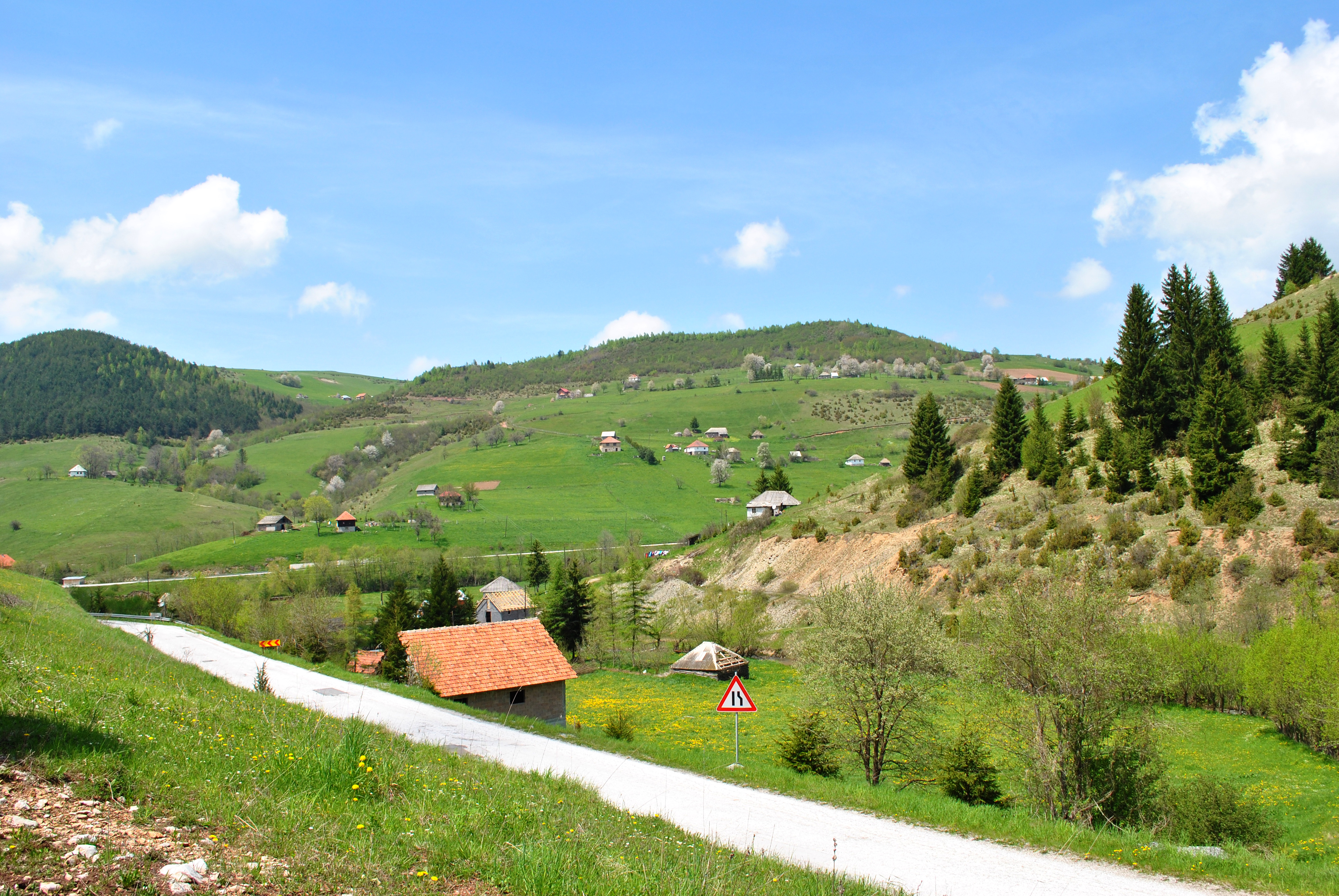
Kladnica village panorama

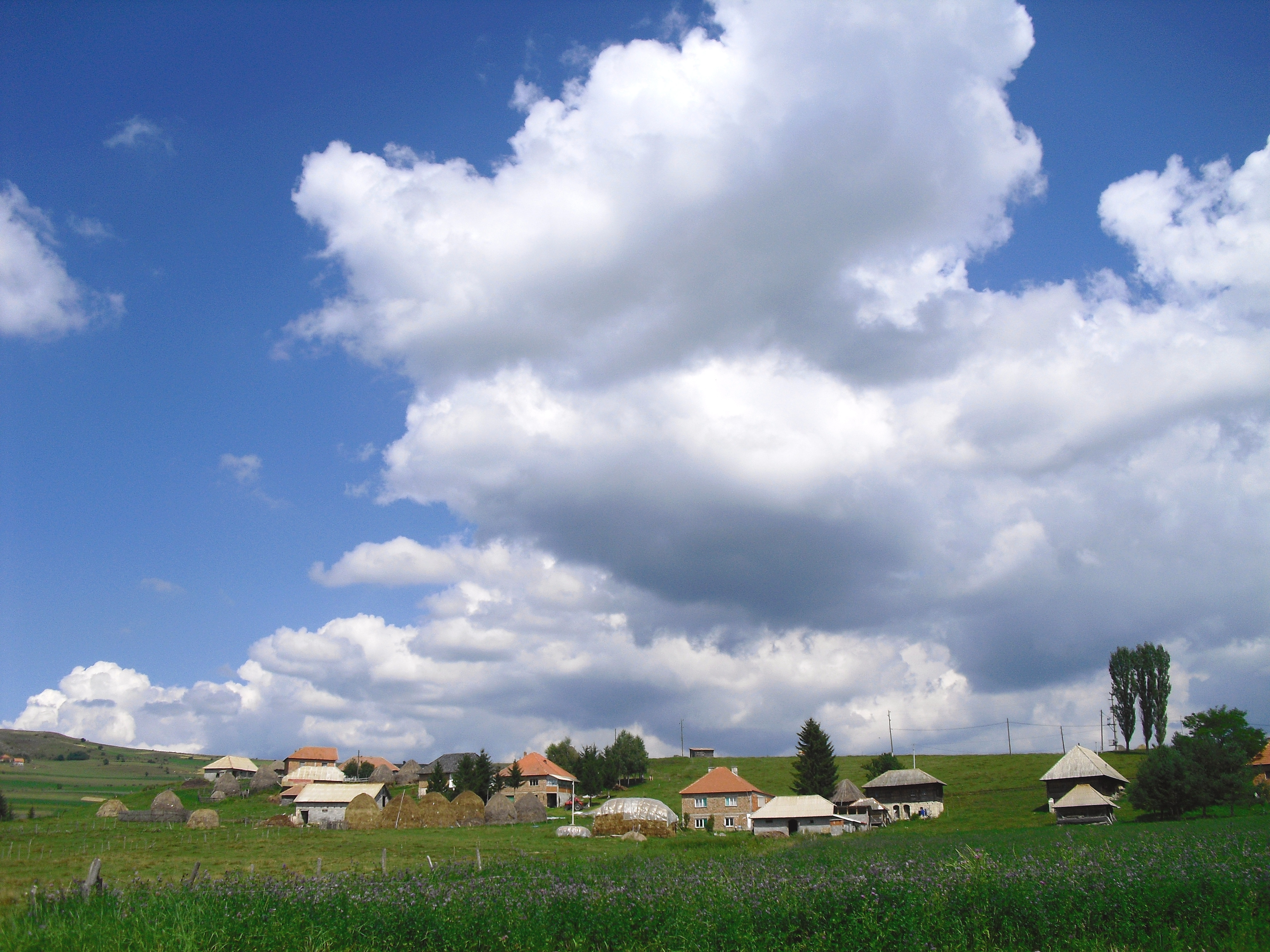
Veskoviće village panorama

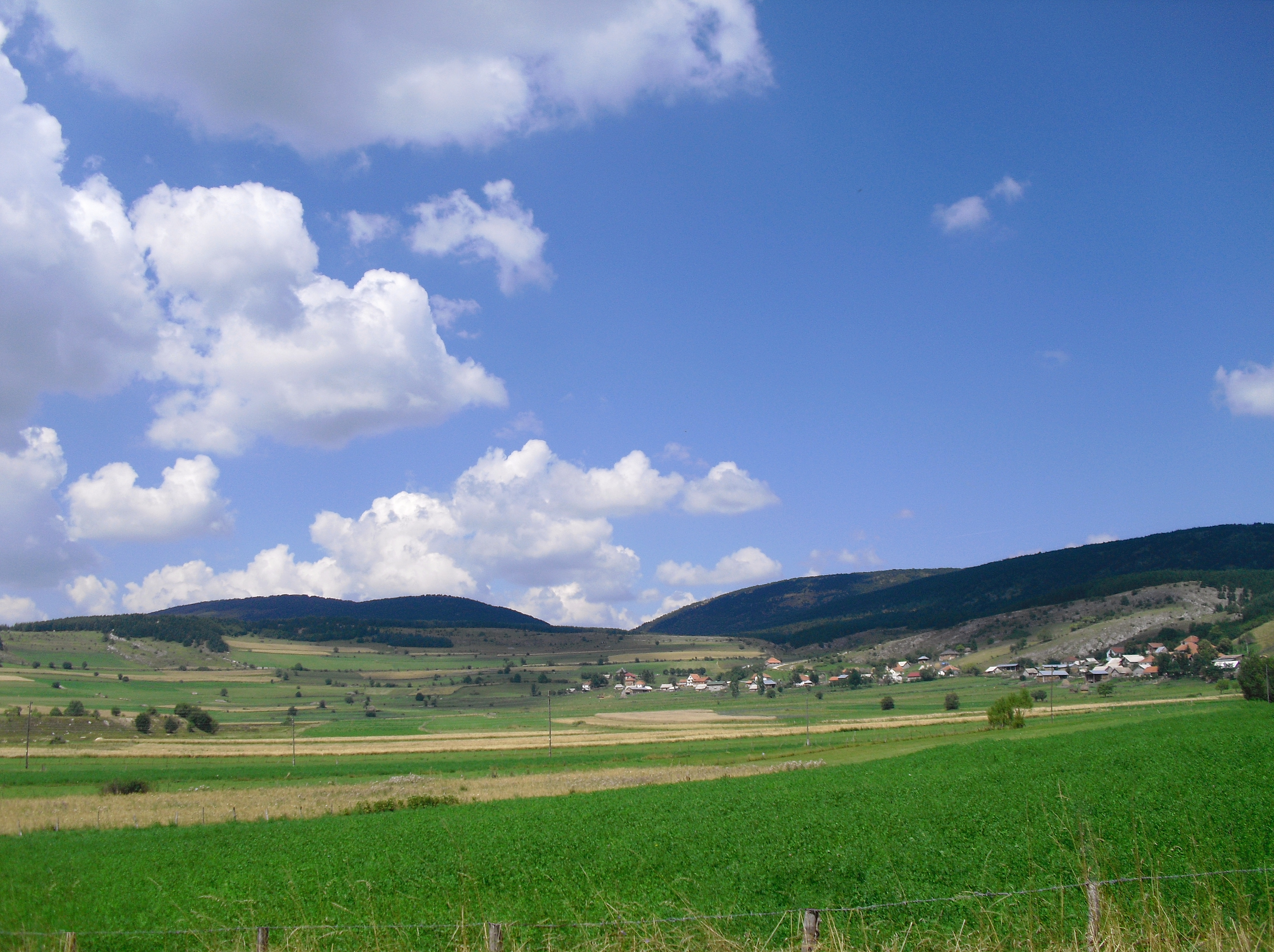
Stup village panorama

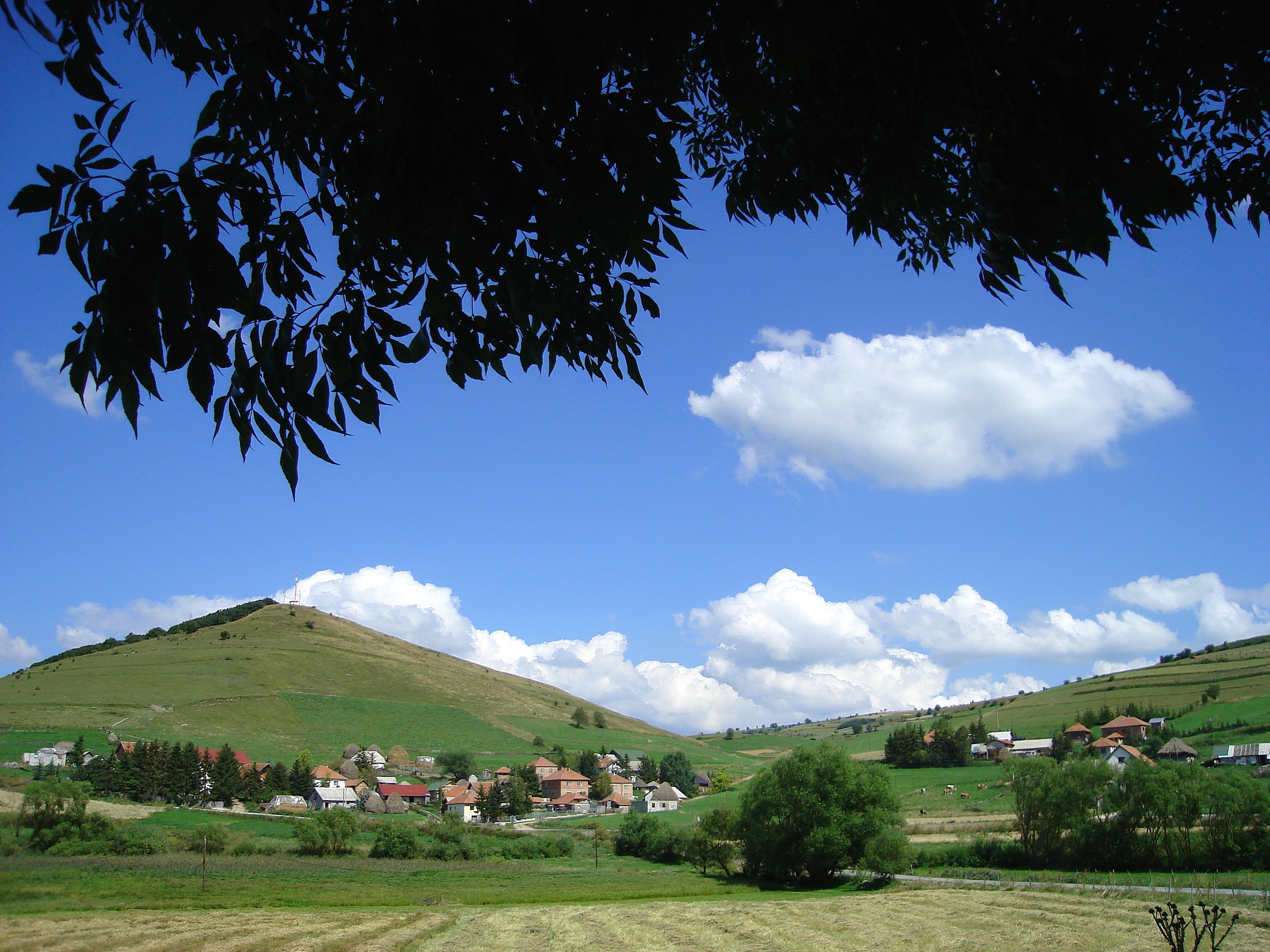
Kneževac village panorama

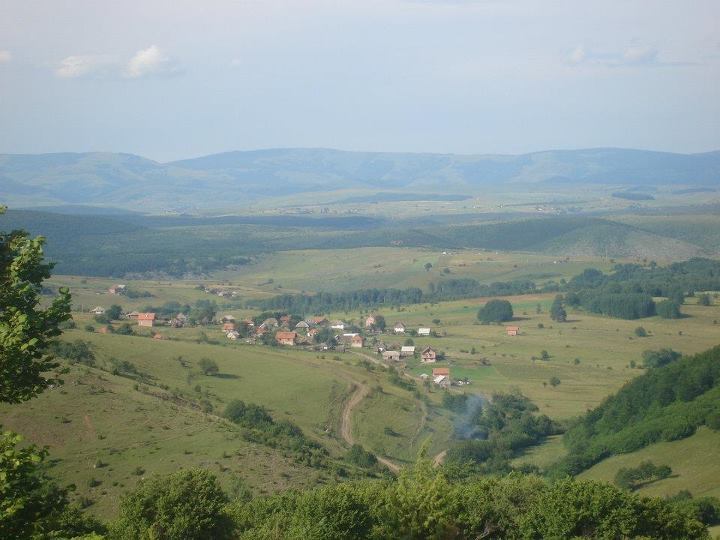
Čitluk village panorama

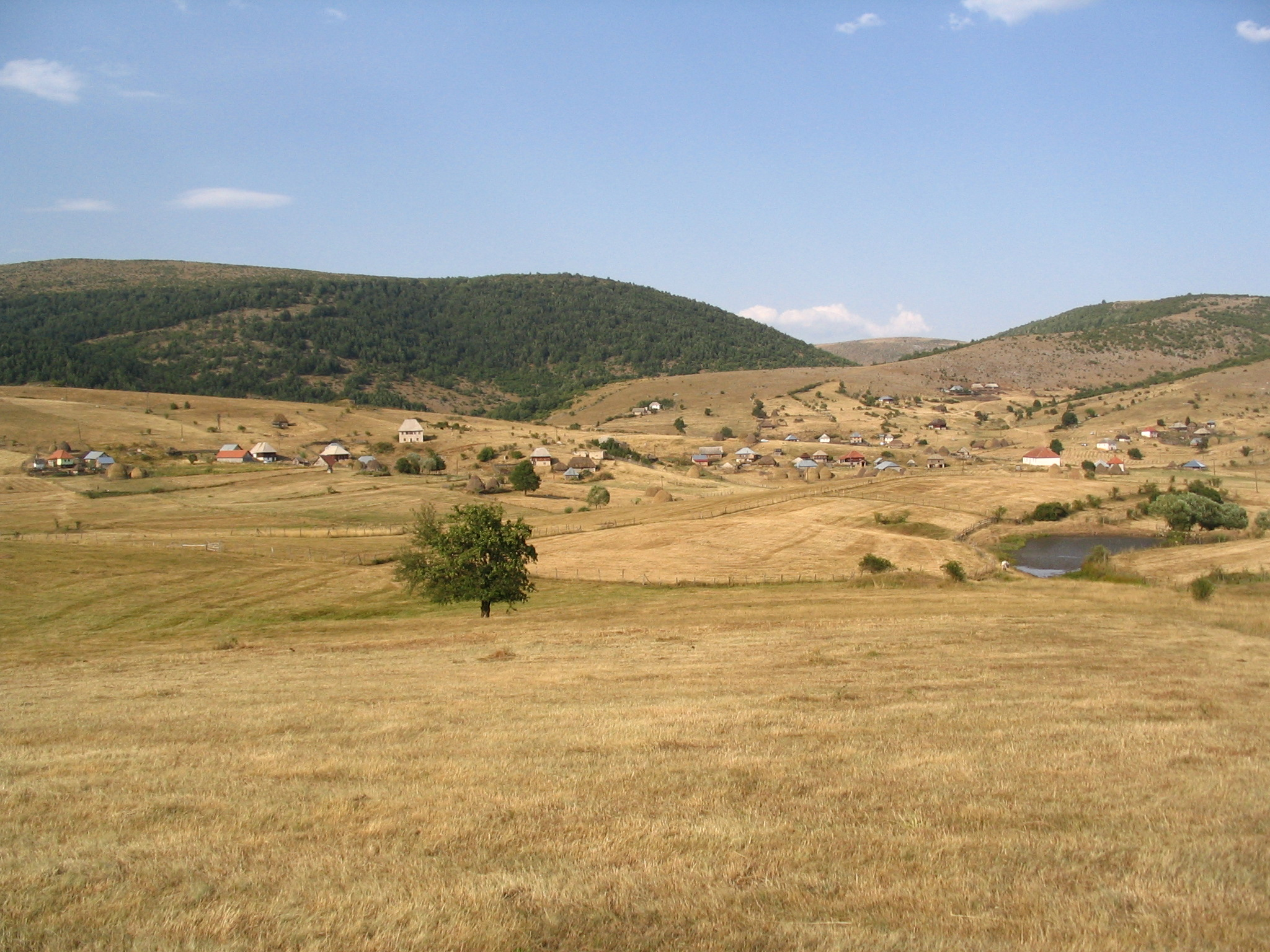
Cvrsko village panorama

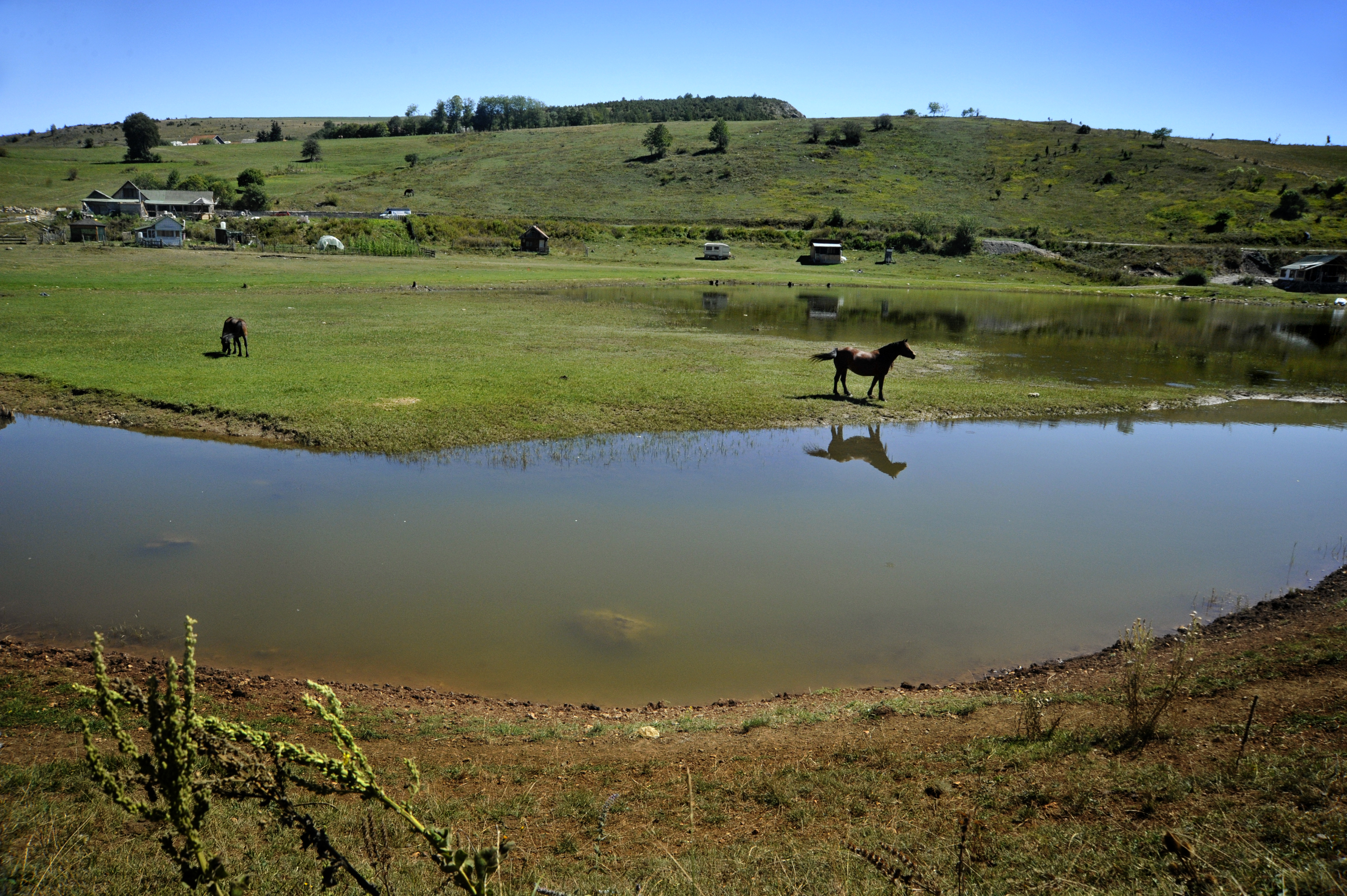
Sjenica Lake

== See also ==
- Bosniaks in Serbia
- Sandžak
- Sjenica Airport

== Notes ==
1.Ski center Žari is national Biathlon center with 5.5km long trails for Nordic sports with shooting range and 850m long trail for Alpine skiing.
