= Boguti =

- Village
- Location within Serbia
- Coordinates: 43°16′N 20°04′E
- Country: Serbia
- District: Zlatibor District
- Municipality: Sjenica

Population (2002)
  - Total: 72
- Time zone: UTC+1 (CET)
  - Summer (DST): UTC+2 (CEST)

Boguti is a village in the municipality of Sjenica, Serbia. According to the 2002 census, the village has a population of 72 people.
