= Jevik =

Jevik Јевик
- Village
- Location within Serbia
- Coordinates: 43°23′N 20°04′E
- Country: Serbia
- District: Zlatibor District
- Municipality: Sjenica

Area
  - Total: 4.72 km^{2} (1.82 sq mi)

Population (2002)
  - Total: 60
  - Density: 13/km^{2} (33/sq mi)
- Time zone: UTC+1 (CET)
  - Summer (DST): UTC+2 (CEST)

Jevik is a village in the municipality of Sjenica, Serbia. According to the 2002 census, the village has a population of 60 people.
