= Karajukića Bunari =

Karajukića Bunari Карајукића Бунари
- Village
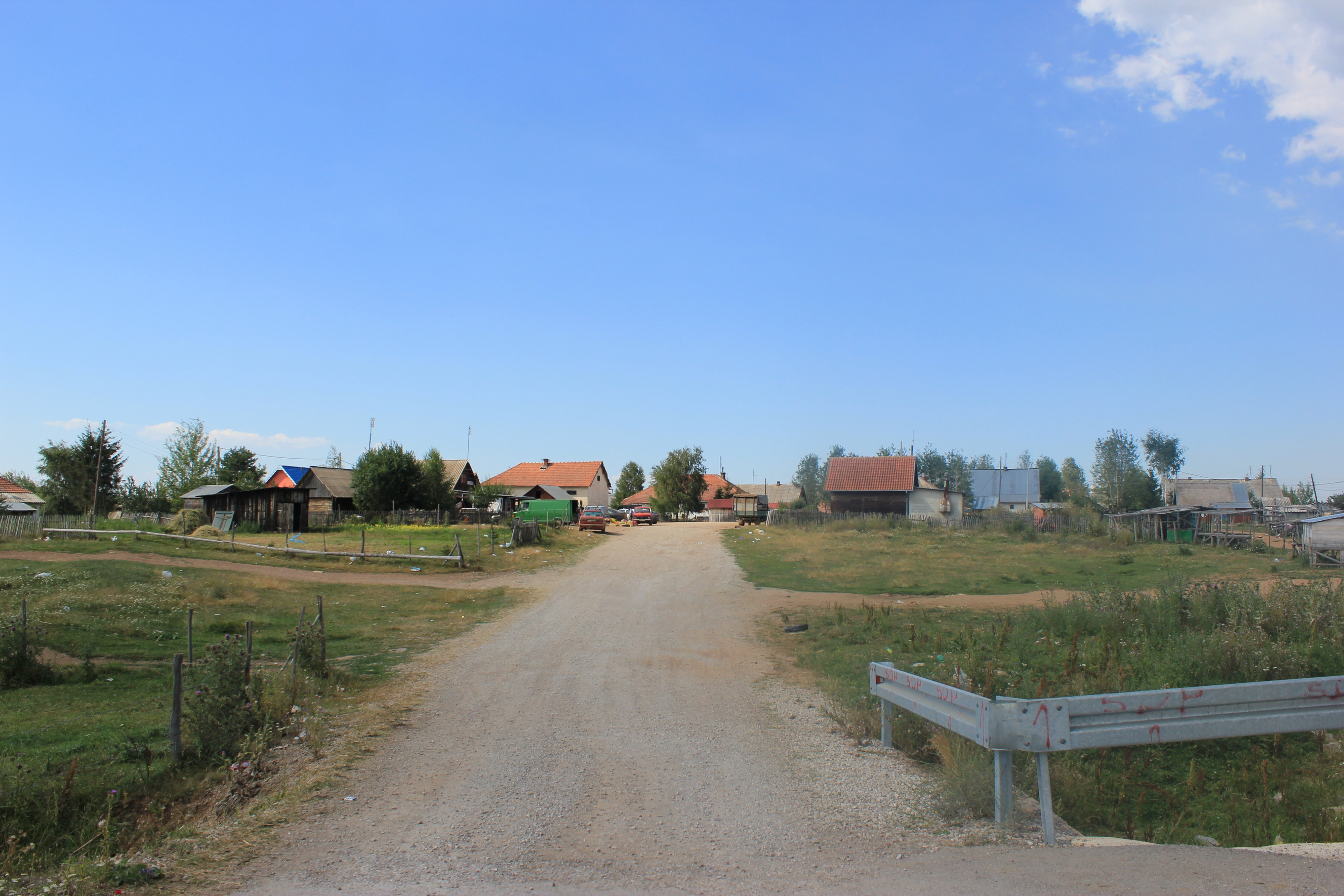
- Karajukića Bunari village landscape

- Location within Serbia
- Coordinates: 43°05′N 20°05′E
- Country: Serbia
- District: Zlatibor District
- Municipality: Sjenica

Area
  - Total: 9.85 km^{2} (3.80 sq mi)
- Elevation: 1,128 m (3,701 ft)

Population (2011)
  - Total: 102
  - Density: 10.4/km^{2} (26.8/sq mi)
- Time zone: UTC+1 (CET)
  - Summer (DST): UTC+2 (CEST)

Karajukića Bunari (Serbian Cyrillic: Карајукића Бунари) is a village located in the municipality of Sjenica, southwestern Serbia. According to the 2011 census, the village has a population of 102 inhabitants.

The village is known for its very low winter temperatures, which have reached as far as −39.8 °C (−39.6 °F) in the January 2006 cold wave.
