= Doliće (Sjenica) =

Doliće Долиће Dolica
- Village
- Interactive map of Doliće
- Coordinates: 43.0906°N 20.0178°E
- Country: Serbia
- District: Zlatibor District
- Municipality: Sjenica

Area
  - Total: 25.80 km^{2} (9.96 sq mi)

Population (2002)
  - Total: 322
  - Density: 12.5/km^{2} (32.3/sq mi)
- Time zone: UTC+1 (CET)
  - Summer (DST): UTC+2 (CEST)

Doliće (Serbian Cyrillic: Долиће; Albanian: Dolica) is a village in the municipality of Sjenica, Serbia. According to the 2002 census, the village has a population of 322 people.

Doliće is one of three Albanian villages (Boroštica, Doliće and Ugao) in the Pešter region. Factors such as some intermarriage undertaken by two generations with the surrounding Bosniak population along with the difficult circumstances of the Yugoslav wars (1990s) made local Albanians opt to refer to themselves in censuses as Bosniaks. Elders in the village still have a degree of fluency in the language.
