= Malonyl-CoA O-methyltransferase =

Identifiers
- EC no.: 2.1.1.197

Databases
- IntEnz: IntEnz view
- BRENDA: BRENDA entry
- ExPASy: NiceZyme view
- KEGG: KEGG entry
- MetaCyc: metabolic pathway
- PRIAM: profile
- PDB structures: RCSB PDB PDBe PDBsum
Search
- PMC: articles
- PubMed: articles
- NCBI: proteins

Malonyl-CoA O-methyltransferase (EC 2.1.1.197, BioC) is an enzyme with systematic name S-adenosyl-L-methionine:malonyl-CoA O-methyltransferase. This enzyme catalyses the following chemical reaction

S-adenosyl-L-methionine + malonyl-CoA $\rightleftharpoons$ S-adenosyl-L-homocysteine + malonyl-CoA methyl ester

Malonyl-CoA O-methyltransferase is involved in an early step of biotin biosynthesis in Gram-negative bacteria.
