= Buđevo =

- Village
- Location within Serbia
- Coordinates: 43°08′N 20°03′E
- Country: Serbia
- District: Zlatibor District
- Municipality: Sjenica

Area
  - Total: 42.58 km^{2} (16.44 sq mi)

Population (2002)
  - Total: 91
  - Density: 2.1/km^{2} (5.5/sq mi)
- Time zone: UTC+1 (CET)
  - Summer (DST): UTC+2 (CEST)

Buđevo is a village in the municipality of Sjenica, Serbia. According to the 2002 census, the village has a population of 91 people.
