= Bioc (Sjenica) =

- Village
- Location within Serbia
- Coordinates: 43°07′N 20°04′E
- Country: Serbia
- District: Zlatibor District
- Municipality: Sjenica

Area
  - Total: 12.40 km^{2} (4.79 sq mi)

Population (2002)
  - Total: 74
  - Density: 6.0/km^{2} (15/sq mi)
- Time zone: UTC+1 (CET)
  - Summer (DST): UTC+2 (CEST)

Bioc is a village in the municipality of Sjenica, Serbia. According to the 2002 census, the village has a population of 74 people.
