= Stari Vlah-Raška mountains =

Mountain group in Serbia

The Stari Vlah-Raška Mountain Range (Старовлашко-Рашке планине, Старовлашко-Рашка висија) is a highland in southwest Serbia, in the regions of Stari Vlah and Raška, which part of the Dinaric Alps. These highlands stretch from Užice, Arilje and Ivanjica to the border with Montenegro.

Its major mountains include.

1. 2,156 m (7,073 ft) Mokra Gora (Raška)
2. 1,833 m (6,014 ft) Golija (Raška)
3. 1,756 m (5,761 ft) Hum (Raška)
4. 1,734 m (5,689 ft) Jadovnik (Stari Vlah)
5. 1,693 m (5,554 ft) Ozren (Stari Vlah)
6. 1,673 m (5,489 ft) Zvijezda (Stari Vlah)
7. 1,643 m (5,390 ft) Radočelo (Raška)
8. 1,627 m (5,338 ft) Zlatar (Stari Vlah)
9. 1,617 m (5,305 ft) Giljeva (Stari Vlah)
10. 1,616 m (5,302 ft) Žilindar (Raška)
11. 1,579 m (5,180 ft) Čemerno (Raška)
12. 1,544 m (5,066 ft) Tara (Stari Vlah)
13. 1,534 m (5,033 ft) Mučanj (Stari Vlah)
14. 1,519 m (4,984 ft) Javor (Stari Vlah)
15. 1,496 m (4,908 ft) Kamena Gora (Stari Vlah)
16. 1,496 m (4,908 ft) Zlatibor (Stari Vlah)
17. 1,495 m (4,905 ft) Čemernica (Stari Vlah)
18. 1,492 m (4,895 ft) Pešter (Raška)
19. 1,486 m (4,875 ft) Javorje (Stari Vlah)
20. 1,480 m (4,856 ft) Murtenica (Stari Vlah)
21. 1,479 m (4,852 ft) Rogozna (Raška)
22. 1,462 m (4,797 ft) Ninaja (Raška)
23. 1,446 m (4,744 ft) Gradina (Stari Vlah)
24. 1,428 m (4,685 ft) Jarut (Raška)
25. 1,423 m (4,669 ft) Pobijenik (Stari Vlah)
26. 1,412 m (4,633 ft) Jabuka (Stari Vlah)
27. 1,386 m (4,547 ft) Bić (Stari Vlah)
28. 1,382 m (4,534 ft) Kukutnica (Stari Vlah)
29. 1,371 m (4,498 ft) Bitovik (Stari Vlah)
30. 1,283 m (4,209 ft) Oštrik (Stari Vlah)
31. 1,282 m (4,206 ft) Banjsko brdo (Stari Vlah)
32. 1,280 m (4,199 ft) Gajeva planina (Stari Vlah)
33. 1,256 m (4,121 ft) Projić (Stari Vlah)
34. 1,188 m (3,898 ft) Crni Vrh (Stari Vlah)

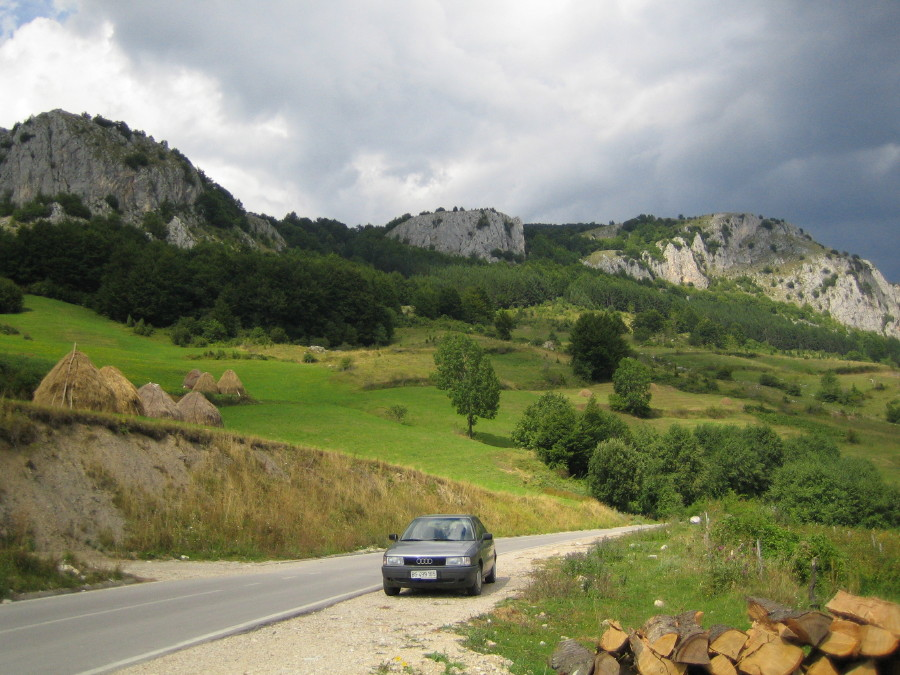
Karst relief forms, typical of the Dinaric mountains, Mučanj

== See also ==
- Mountains of Serbia
