= Uvac Lake =

- Meanders of the Uvac Lake, from the Molitva viewpoint

- Location within Serbia
- Location: Southwest Serbia
- Lake type: Reservoir
- Part of: Uvac river
- Basin countries: Serbia
- First flooded: 1979
- Average depth: 100 m (330 ft)
- Max. depth: 108 m (354 ft)
- Water volume: 212 million cubic metres (7.5×10^{9} cu ft)
- Surface elevation: 985 m (3,232 ft)
- Settlements: Akmačići and Bukovik, Nova Varoš municipality
- Website: Special Nature Reserve Uvac

Uvac Lake (Serbian: Увачко језеро), also commonly known as the Sjenica Lake (Сјеничко језеро), is an artificial lake in southwestern Serbia, located between the villages of Akmačići and Bukovik in the municipality of Nova Varoš, between the mountains Zlatar and Javor, at an altitude of 985 m. It was created by the damming of the Uvac river at the village of Akmačići, the dam measuring 160m in length and being 110 m high. Until 2001, it was 7,5–20 km long, 100 m wide and 100 m deep, and in 2001 it was measured at c. 25 km long with 212 million cubic meters water volume. The temperature measures the lowest in February, while the highest are recorded in July and August (15–16 celsius). It fills a deep gorge that the Uvac cut into, of the limestone massif of the Sjenica plateau, as well the canyon parts of the Veljušnica and Kladnica confluences. The Uvac hydroelectric power plant was built in 1979.

The area of the lower part of the lake and the initial part of the Zlatar Lake was declared the Uvac River Gorge special nature reserve (Клисура реке Увац) in 1995, part of the Uvac Special Nature Reserve.

The lake has been described as having tourism potential.

== See also ==
- Zlatar Lake
- Radoinja Lake
- List of lakes in Serbia

== Sources ==
- Резерват Увац д.о.о., "Увачко (Сјеничко) језеро", Увачка језера, Резерват Увац д.о.о. [Uvac Reserve]
- Стаменковић, Србољуб Ђ. (2001). Географска енциклопедиjа насеља Србиjе: М-Р. III. Универзитет у Београду. Географски факултет. ISBN 978-86-82657-15-6.
- Pavlović, Mila; Golić, Rajko (2011). "Tourism potentials of the Raška region and development of rural tourism". Bulletin of the Serbian geographical society. 91 (3): 39–64.
