= Radoinje Lake =

- Radoinje Lake

- Location within Serbia
- Location: Southwest Serbia
- Lake type: Reservoir
- Basin countries: Serbia
- Max. length: 11 km (6.8 mi)
- Max. width: 500 m (1,600 ft)
- Max. depth: 30 m (98 ft)
- Water volume: 4 million cubic metres (140×10^{6} cu ft)
- Surface elevation: 760 m (2,490 ft)
- Settlements: Nova Varoš municipality

Radoinje Lake (Serbian: Радоињско језеро) is an artificial lake in southwestern Serbia, located within the Uvac Special Nature Reserve. It was created by erecting a dam 43 km from the confluence of the Uvac and Lim rivers. The dam was built at 760 m above sea level, 40 m high and 150 m long. The length of the lake is 11 km, with maximum depth of water 30 m, with a capacity of 4 million cubic metres. It receives its water through the bottom of the Zlatar Lake, additionally passing through the Kokin Brod hydroelectric power plant. The lake functions as a water reservoir for the Bistrica hydroelectric power plant on the right bank of Potpeć Lake of the Lim river. It is the third of the three lakes of the Uvac Reserve, the other being Uvac Lake and Zlatar Lake. The lake has tourism potential.

== See also ==
- Uvac Lake
- Zlatar Lake
- List of lakes in Serbia

== Sources ==
- Резерват Увац д.о.о., "Радоињско језеро", Увачка језера, Резерват Увац д.о.о. [Uvac Reserve]
- Pavlović, Mila; Golić, Rajko (2011). "Tourism potentials of the Raška region and development of rural tourism". Bulletin of the Serbian geographical society. 91 (3): 39–64.
