= Pešter =

Geographic micro-region in Serbia

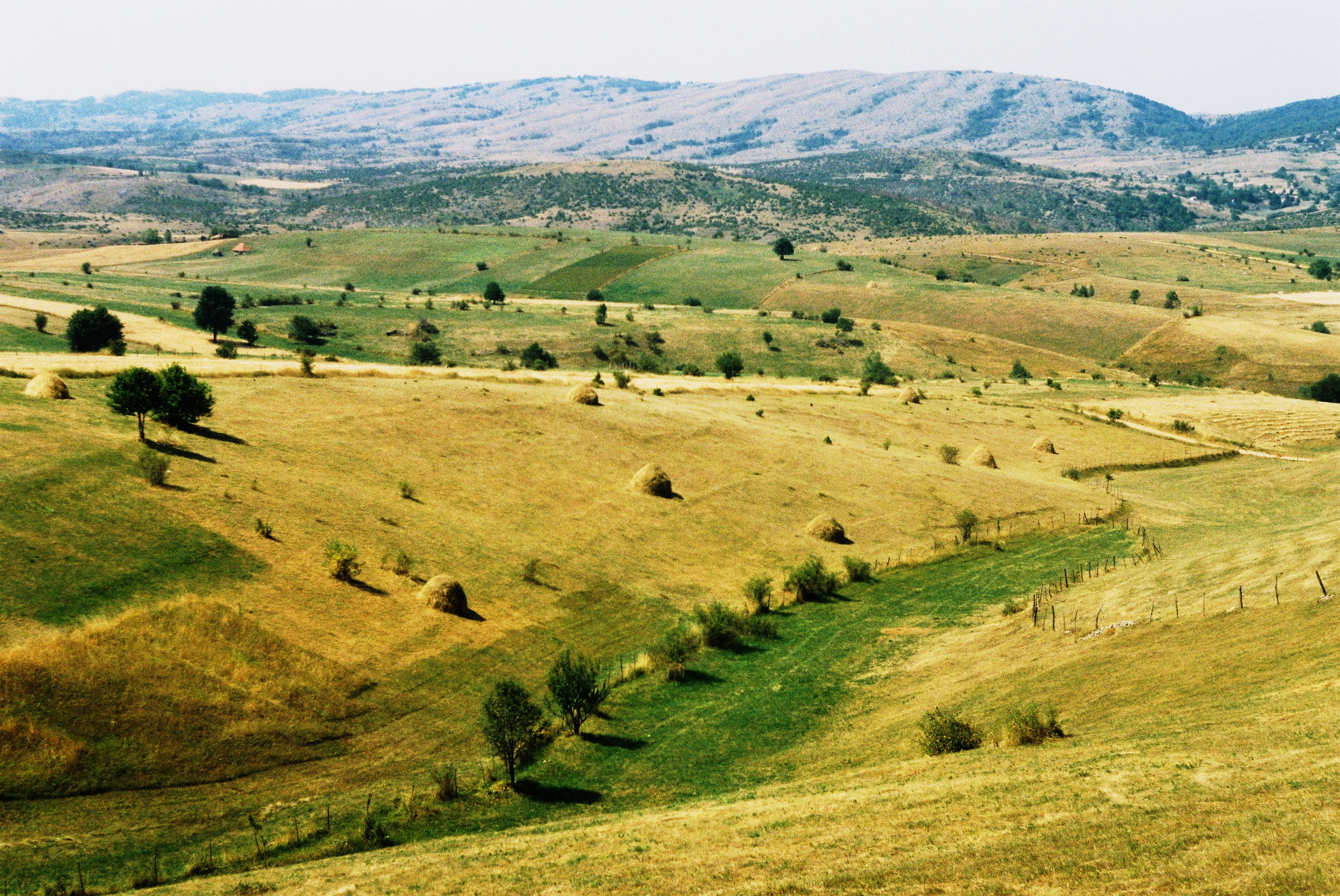

Highest point
- Elevation: 1,492 m (4,895 ft)
- Coordinates: 43°03′04″N 20°03′21″E

Geography
- Location within Serbia
- Location: Serbia

Ramsar Wetland
- Official name: Pestersko polje
- Designated: 19 March 2006
- Reference no.: 1656

The Pešter Plateau (Serbian: Пештерска висораван, romanized: Pešterska visoravan), or simply Pešter (Serbian Cyrillic: Пештер, pronounced [pɛ̌ʃtɛr]) is a karst plateau in southwestern Serbia, in the Sandžak region.

It lies at an altitude of 1,150–1,492 metres (3,773–4,895 ft), with the highest point (Kuljarski vrh) at 1,492 meters. The territory of the plateau is mostly located in the municipality of Sjenica, with parts belonging to Novi Pazar and Tutin.

== Etymology ==
The name of the region comes from the common Slavic word Church Slavonic: пещера, romanized: peštera, meaning "cave".

In the speech of people native to the area, the original feminine gender of the word is preserved despite the loss of the -a ending (nominative Pešter, genitive and locative Pešteri), but in standard Serbian the gender is masculine (nominative Pešter, genitive Peštera, locative Pešteru).

== Geography ==
The plateau is actually a large field (Peštersko polje) surrounded by the mountains of Jadovnik (1734 m), Zlatar (1627 m), Ozren (1693 m), Giljeva (1617 m), Javor (1519 m), Golija (1833 m), Žilindar (1616 m), Hum (1756 m), Ninaja (1462 m) and Jarut (1428 m).

With an area of around 50 km^{2}, the Pešter field is the largest field in Serbia, and the highest one in the Balkans. The rivers of Uvac, Vapa, Jablanica and Grabovica flow through this plateau.

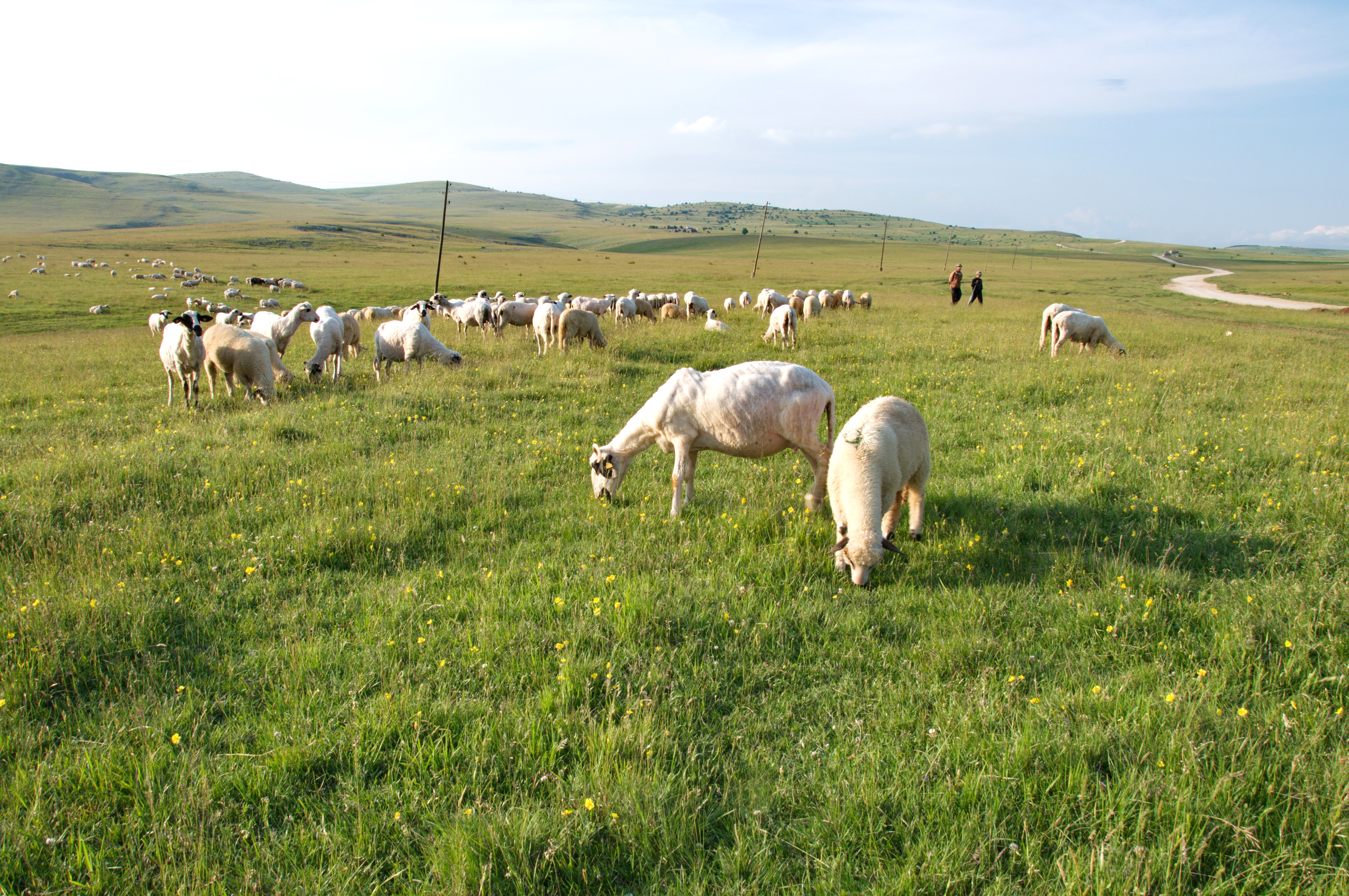
Pešter Plateau landscape with cattle

In the geologic past, the field was a large lake, of which only a small remnant in Sjenica near the village of Tuzinje remains. This lake gradually drained through karst ruptures, leaving marshy remnants in the lowest parts, around the flow of the sinking river Boroštica. Those areas are home to a wet peat bog habitat that is unique for a karst area. The soil is mostly karst interspersed with pastures. The economy of the area relies primarily on livestock breeding, chiefly of sheep. Pešter is famous for its dairy products, especially the "Sjenica cheese" (Sjenički sir), as well as lamb and pršut (or prosciutto).

The plateau is sparsely populated: most settlements are on the edge of the field, and the remainder is settled only during the summer months. Pešter is famous for its microclimate, which is particularly harsh in the winter months, and due to this, it is often called the "Siberia of Sandžak". The lowest temperature in Serbia since measurements have been recorded, −39 °C (−38 °F), was measured at Karajukića Bunari village on 26 January 2006, beating the previous record of −38.4 °C (−37.1 °F) measured in Sjenica in 1954.

On 1 May 2006, Ramsar included the Pešter wetland area of 3,455 hectares into its list of wetlands of international importance. Pešter is home to a number of endangered plant species, such as Fumana bonapartei, Halacsya sendtneri, and Orchis tridentata. The only nesting place of Montagu's harrier in Serbia is also in this area.

== History ==
In the Pešter region, few, if any, descendants of the population that inhabited the area prior to the 17th century remain. Significant demographic changes occurred during the 18th century, when a series of political and military events led to the displacement of earlier inhabitants and the arrival of new settlers. In 1700, the High Porte of the Ottoman Empire ordered the Pasha of Peja to pacify the Rugova region, resulting in the relocation of 274 families from Rugova to Pešter.

During this period, members of the Shkreli and Kelmendi tribes migrated into the plateau. The Kelmendi tribal leader had converted to Islam and reportedly pledged to encourage conversion among his followers. Approximately 251 Kelmendi households (1,987 individuals) were resettled in the region, although many returned to their homeland within several years. Those who remained, including parts of the Shkreli and Kelmendi, gradually adopted Islam and, by the 20th century, had largely become Slavic-speaking and identified as Bosniaks. The Albanian language continued to be used in parts of the Pešter Plateau until the mid-20th century.

Catholic Albanian groups that settled in the early 18th century were also converted to Islam during this period, and their descendants today constitute a substantial portion of the population.

Recent historiographical work has further examined the long-term migrations of Shkreli (Škrijelj) descendants in the region. A contemporary publication documents a multi-century trajectory from the Shkrel area of northern Albania (recorded as early as 1416), to Rugova, then to Pešter (notably the Tutin area in the 19th century), and later to Istanbul in the mid-20th century. The book combines personal narratives with documentary evidence from the Venetian State Archives and Ottoman archival sources, providing a longitudinal account of one family's migration history over approximately six centuries.

Zuko Shkreli (Skrijelj, 1803–1868) was one of the senior Shkreli family members and was born in Shkrel (Rugova, Kosova) and migrated to Pester, Naboje in 1853. His grave is across Naboje village in Çafa according to his will from where he can see Naboje and his birthplace Rugova. His descendants are today living in Pester, Europe and Turkey with surnames like Skrelj, Skrijelj, Zukovic or Hadzic.

The book has also been presented to diaspora communities originating from the Pešter and Sandžak regions. One such presentation took place at the Türkiye Bosna Sancak Derneği in Istanbul, attended primarily by members of the Pešter-origin community.

== Gallery ==
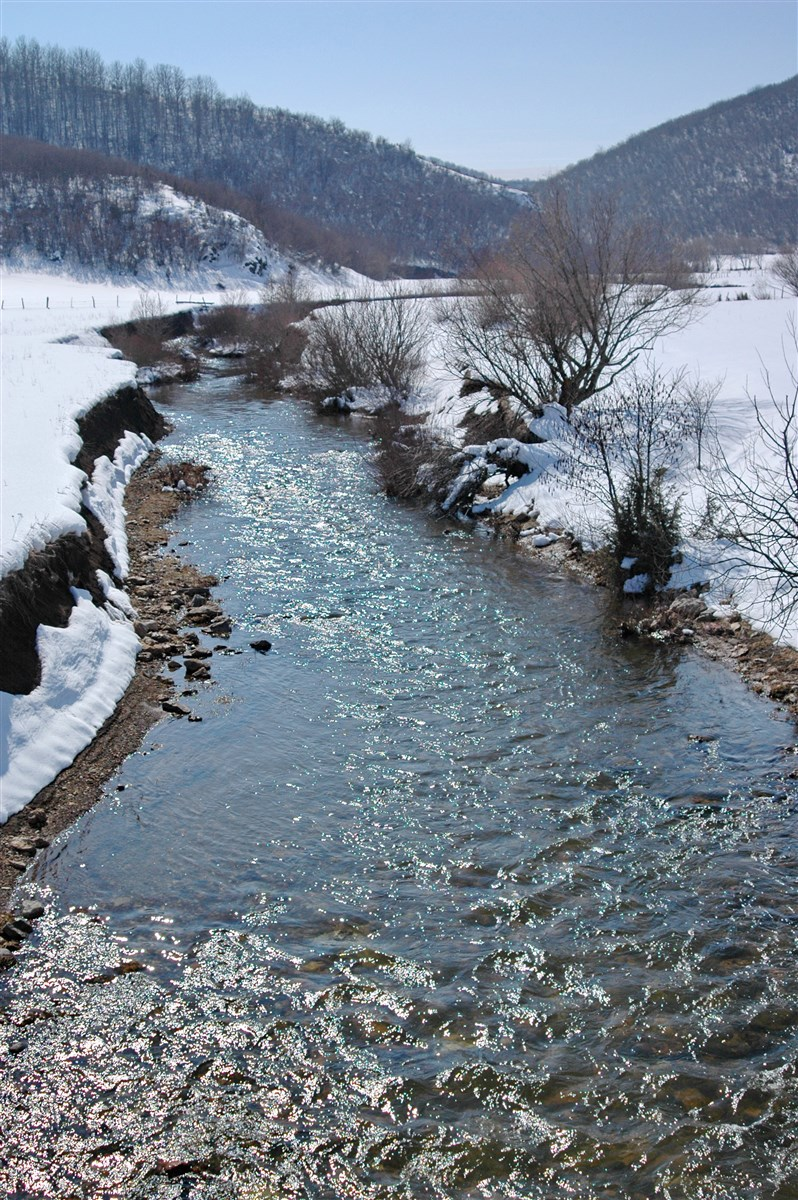

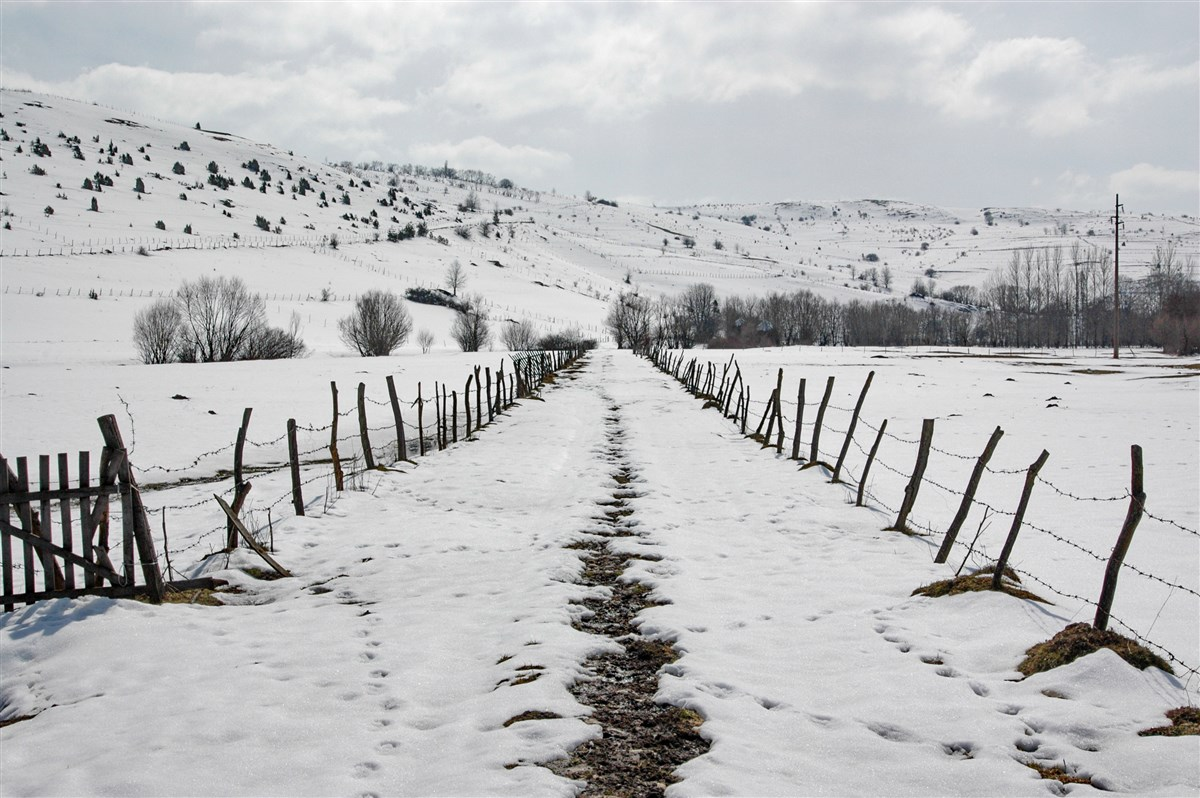

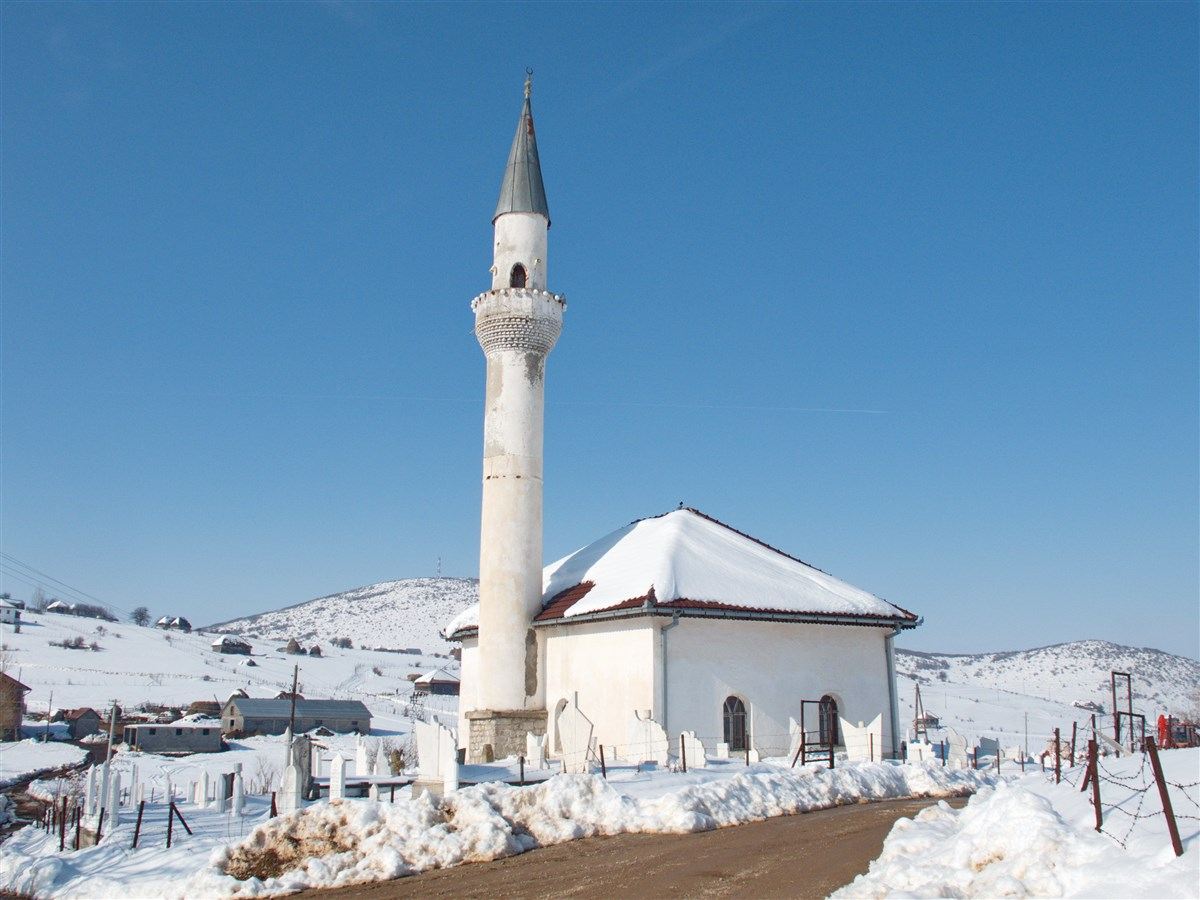

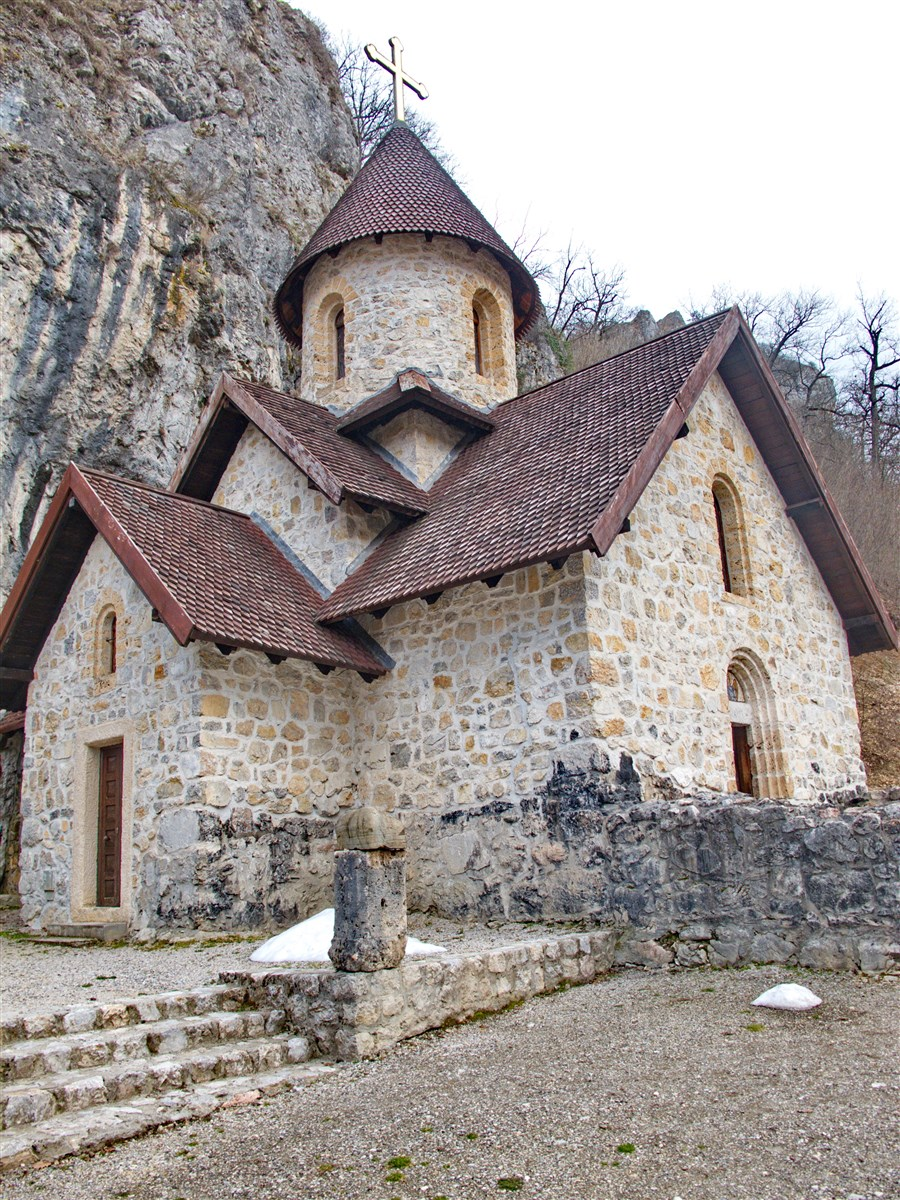

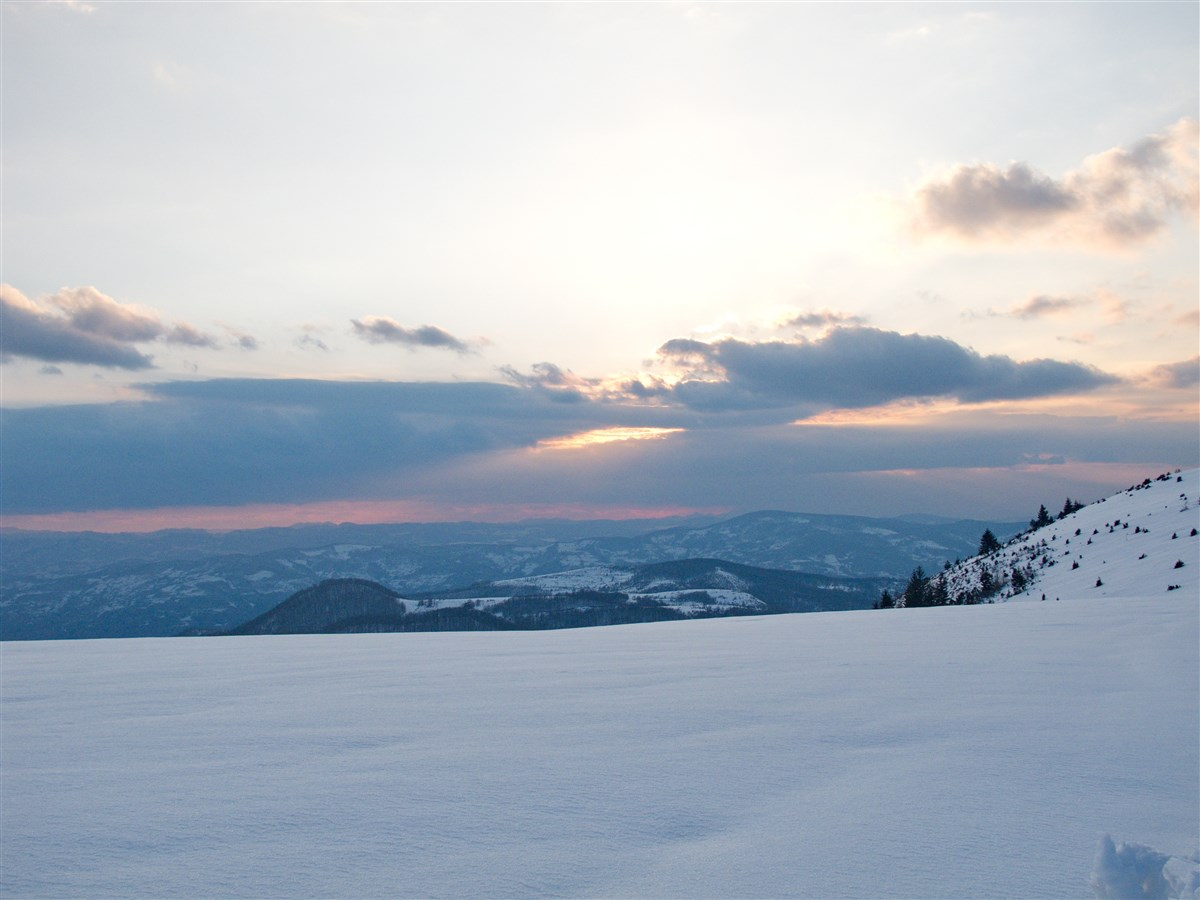

== See also ==
- List of regions of Serbia
