= Lim (river) =

River through Montenegro, Serbia, and Bosnia and Herzegovina

Lim Лим Lumi i Vermoshit
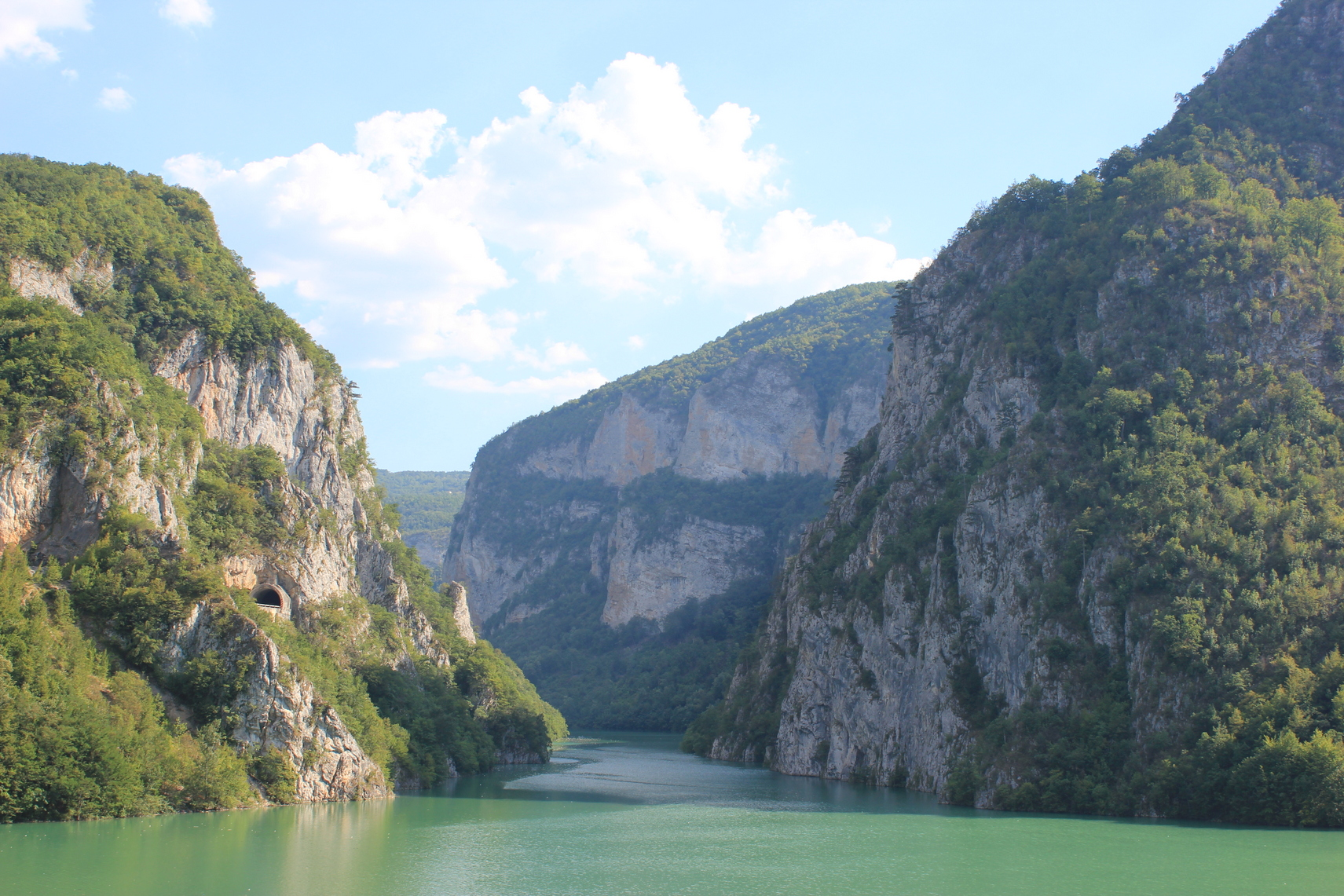
- Lim and Drina confluence in Bosnia and Herzegovina

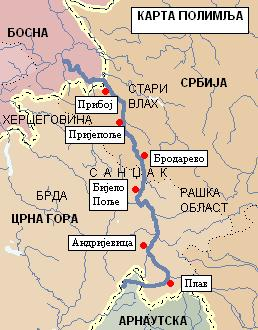

Location
- Countries: Albania; Montenegro; Serbia; Bosnia and Herzegovina

Physical characteristics
- Source
  - location: Maglič Peak,Kuči, Montenegro-Albania border
  - coordinates: 42°36′50″N 19°35′57″E
  - elevation: 19° 35' 57.59"
- Mouth: Drina
  - location: Brodar, Bosnia and Herzegovina
  - coordinates: 43°44′06″N 19°12′18″E
- Length: 219 km (136 mi)
- Basin size: 5,968 km^{2} (2,304 sq mi)

Basin features
- Progression: Drina→ Sava→ Danube→ Black Sea
- River system: Black Sea
- Waterbodies: Lake Plav, Ali Pasha's Wellsprings

The Lim (Serbian Cyrillic: Лим, pronounced [lîm]) or Vermosh River (Albanian: Lumi i Vermoshit) is a river that flows through Albania, Montenegro, Serbia and Bosnia and Herzegovina and is 219 km (136 mi) long. It is also the right and the longest tributary of the Drina.

== Etymology ==
According to linguists such as Franz Miklosich, Eqrem Çabej, Aleksandar Loma, and Ivan Popović; Lim can be etymologically derived from the Albanian lumë, meaning "river". According to Loma, the hydronym likely entered South Slavic sometime before the 10th or 12th centuries CE, depending on if the hydronym was adopted into Slavic directly from lumë or its dialectal form, lymë. For a potential derivation from the former, Loma argues that the vowel /i/ arose from earlier Slavic /ы/, exemplified by the 13th century attestation of Lыmь, and that /ы/ may have acted as a substitute for /u/, if so an adoption from lumë would have occurred prior to the 10th century. However, Loma also argues that Old Serbian Lыm(ь) may have been directly adopted from lymë, in which case it must have been inherited prior to the 12th century. Lim was subsequently passed back into Albanian. According to Popović, the hydronym does not represent an ancient substrate, but rather a pre-Slavic Albanian layer, to which Loma agrees by claiming that the river was considered to be a part of the Drinus and was thus referred to as such.

== Course ==
=== Albania, Montenegro and Serbia ===
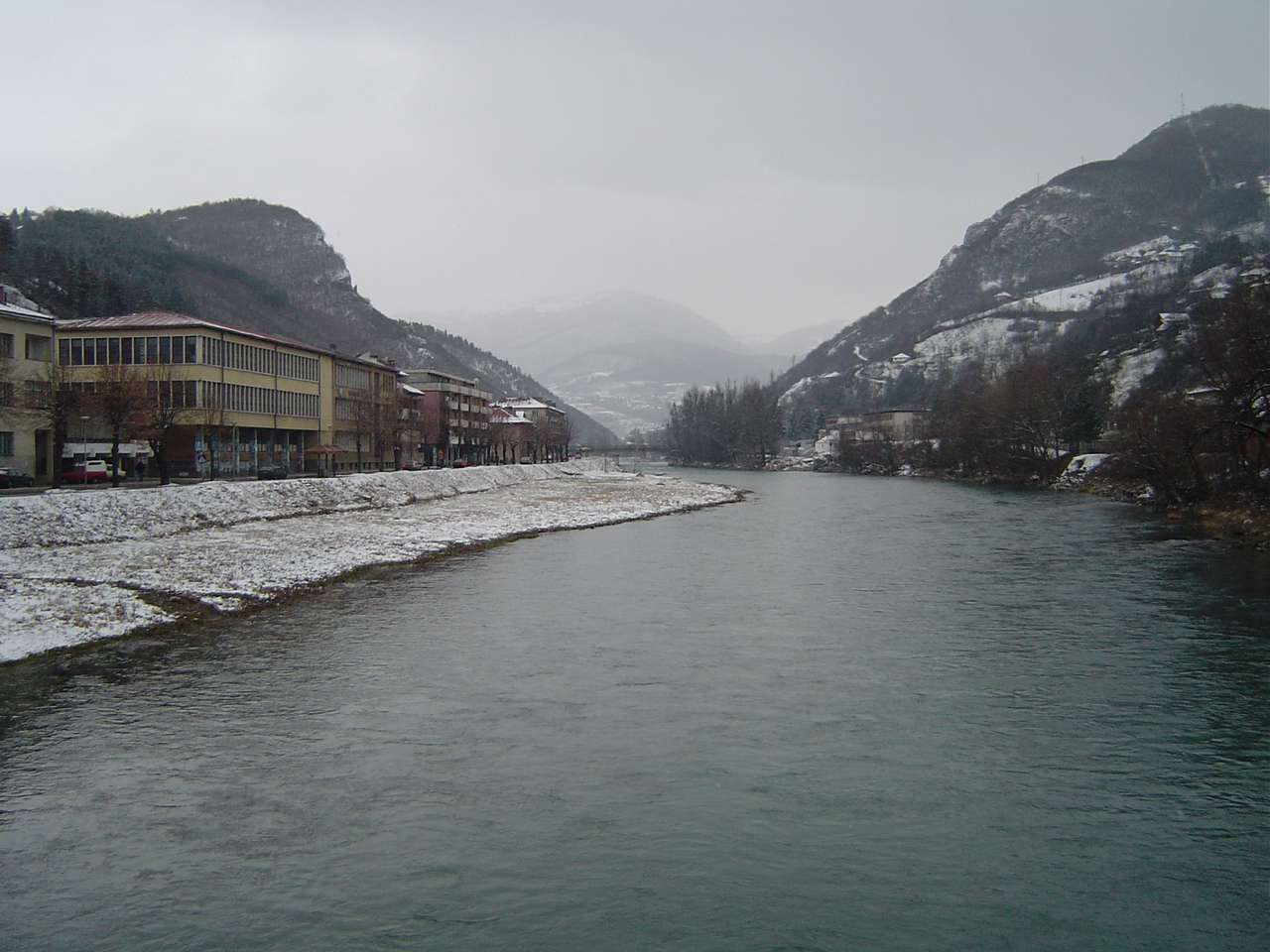
Lim flowing through Prijepolje

The Lim rises below Maglić peak in the Kuči area of eastern Montenegro, very close to the Albanian border, under the name of Vermosh. Its source is only a few kilometers away from the source of the Tara river, but the two rivers go in opposite directions: the Tara to the north-west and the Vermosh to the east, and after only a few kilometers the Lim crosses into Albania (Albanian: Lumi i Vermoshit). Passing through the Accursed Mountains in Albania and the village of Vermosh, it re-enters Montenegro under the name of Grnčar. Receiving the Vruje stream from Ali Pasha's Wellsprings from the right at Gusinje, it continues as Ljuča for a few more kilometers until it empties into the Lake Plav, creating a small delta. It flows out of the lake to the north, next to the high mountain Visitor, under the name Lim for the remaining 193 km (120 mi).

It passes through Murino, continuing generally to the north through areas of Vasojevići, Gornji Kolašin, Donji Kolašin and Komarani, the Tivran gorge and the cities of Andrijevica, Berane, Bijelo Polje, Resnik and Nedakusi, entering Serbia between villages of Dobrakovo and Gostun. It receives the right tributaries of Lješnica (between the villages of Poda and Skakavac) and Bistrica (near the border) and left tributary of Ljuboviđa, near Bijelo Polje.

=== Serbia and Bosnia and Herzegovina ===
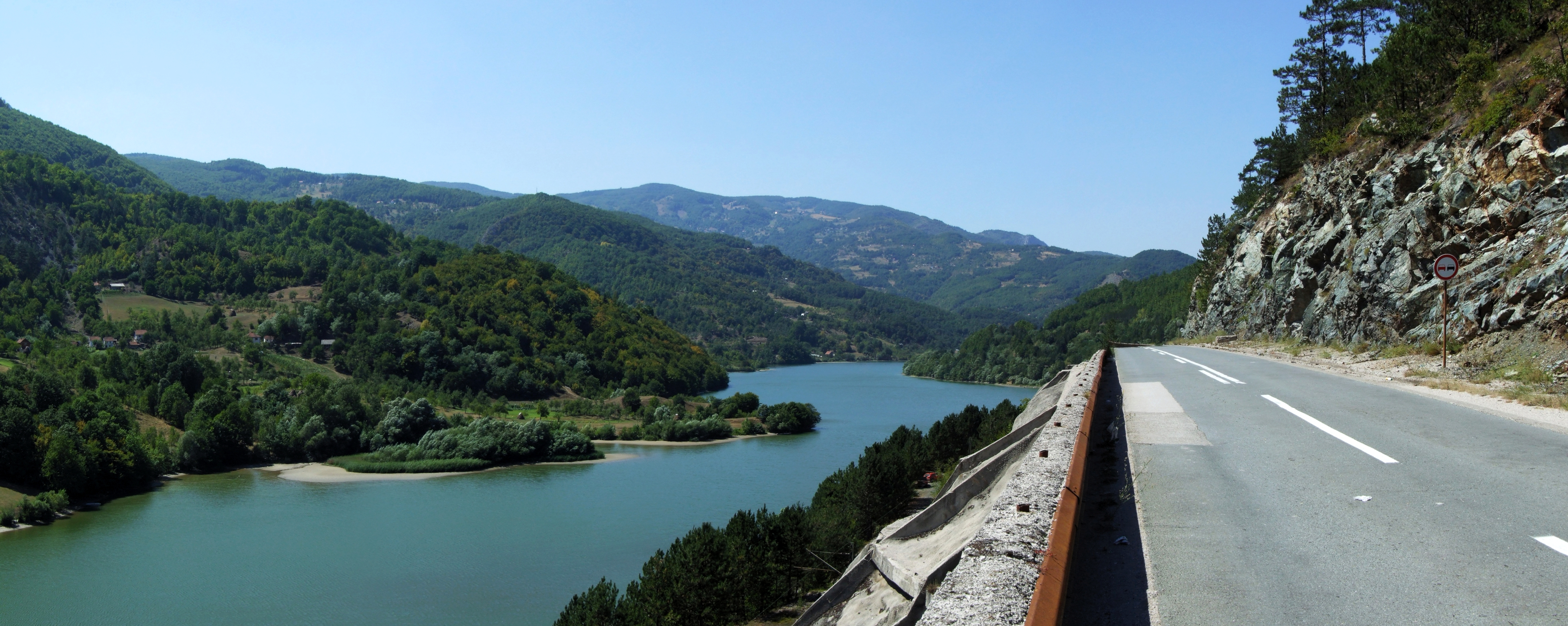
Potpeć Reservoir and road Prijepolje-Priboj

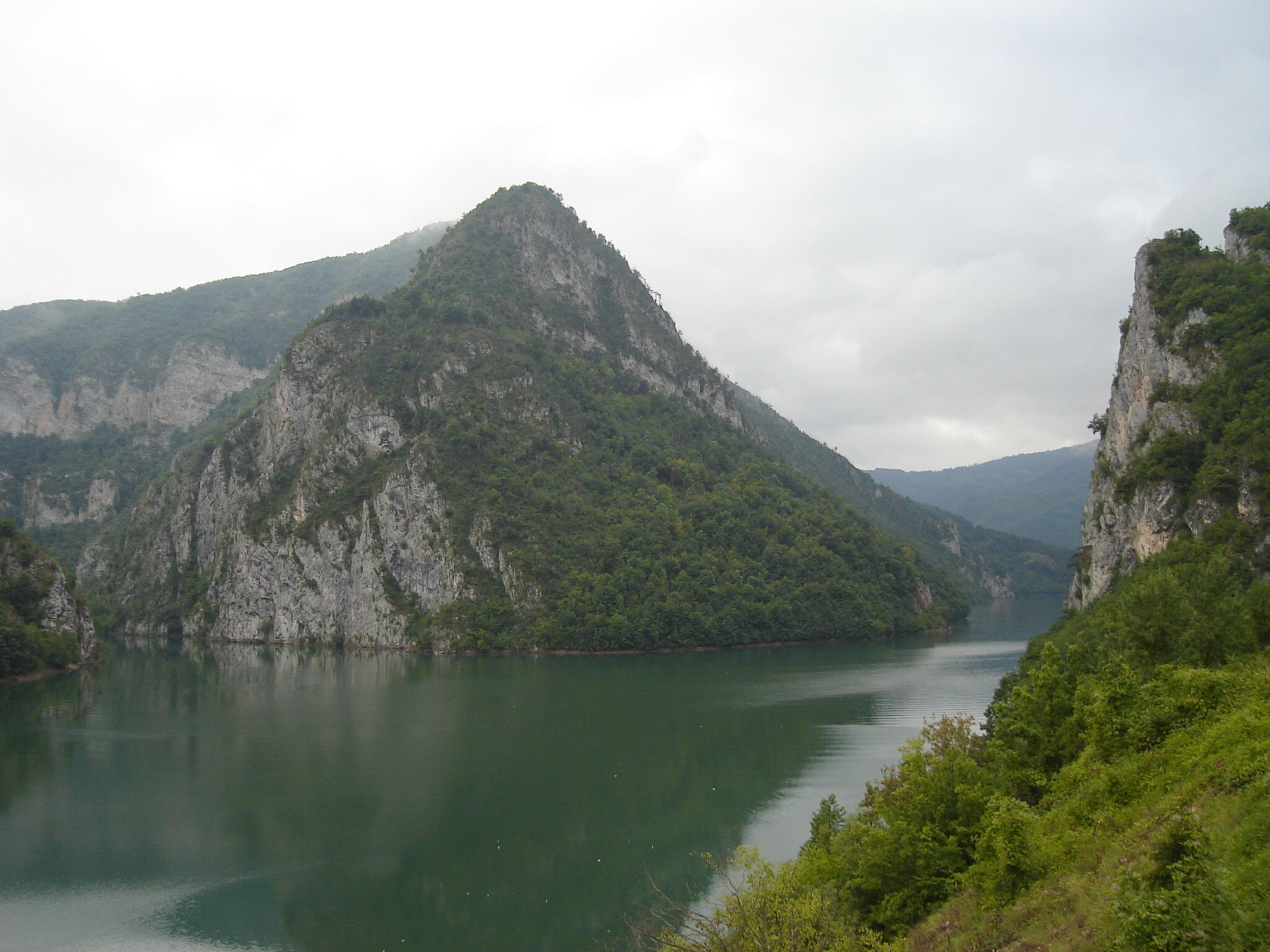
Lim and Drina confluence in Bosnia and Herzegovina

In the border area, the Lim carved a long gorge Kumanička klisura, between the mountains of Lisa (in Montenegro) and Ozren (in Serbia). Lim continues between the mountains of Jadovnik, Pobijenik and Zlatar, and runs through the northern part of the Sandžak area (or Raška oblast). Upstream of Priboj, the river is dammed by the hydro power plant "Potpeć", creating Potpeć Reservoir. The villages of Garčanica and Lučice and the towns of Brodarevo, Prijepolje, Pribojska Banja and Priboj. After Priboj it turns north-west and enters Bosnia and Herzegovina, but only for a few kilometers when it flows back to Serbia and then again to Bosnia at Rudo. In Bosnia and Herzegovina, Lim flows between the mountains of Bić, Javorje and Vučevica from the south, and the Varda mountain from the north, before it empties into the Drina near the village of Međeđa. The lowest section of the river is flooded by the Višegrad Reservoir, created by the Višegrad hydroelectrical power plant on the Drina.

== Characteristics ==
Lim belongs to the Black Sea drainage basin through Drina, Sava and Danube. Its drainage basin covers 5,968 km^{2} (2,304 sq mi) and the river is not navigable.

It receives many smaller streams in Montenegro and Bosnia and Herzegovina, however, the two most important are its major right tributaries in Serbia, the Uvac and the Mileševa river.

== Polimlje ==
The fertile valley of the river is called Polimlje (Полимље), meaning "Lim valley". It represents area around composite river valley, made of several gorges and depressions. The valley is divided in three large parts, Montenegrin, Stari Vlah and Bosnian.

It is important agricultural region, especially for cultivating fruits and stockbreeding. It is also an important route for both the road and railways from Serbia to Montenegro and Adriatic coast, most notably, the Belgrade-Bar railway. Industry is not much developed (smaller industrial centers are Berane, Bijelo Polje and Prijepolje), except for heavily industrialized Priboj. Most use of the river has Serbian electricity production, with power station Potpeć being constructed and several more stations on the Lim's major tributary, the Uvac.

Despite the potentials, the entire area the Lim flows through is undeveloped and for decades highly depopulating.

== Border dispute ==
After breakup of Yugoslavia in 1991-1992, on the part of Lim's course entering and re-entering Serbia and Bosnia, several villages of Serbia remained physically cut off from the rest of the republic's territory. The governments in Belgrade and Sarajevo proposed an exchange of territories but no agreement was reached.

== Lim River tragedy ==
On 4 April 2004, around 10 PM, a bus carrying Bulgarian tourists (34 students and 16 adults) back to their native Svishtov from a trip to Dubrovnik in Croatia fell and sank in the river near the Serbian village of Gostun close to the border with Montenegro as the driver lost control over it during a turn on a mountain road. Twelve children died, the other 38 people being saved with the aid of the locals.

== See also ==
- List of rivers of Bosnia and Herzegovina
- List of rivers of Montenegro
- List of rivers of Serbia
