= Zlatar =

- Pronunciation: Serbo-Croatian: [zlǎtaːr]

Origin
- Language: Proto-Slavic
- Derivation: zolto
- Meaning: Goldsmith

Zlatar is a surname derived from the Proto-Slavic word zolto, which translates to goldsmith. It is common across Europe, specifically countries in Southeast Europe such as Bosnia and Herzegovina and Croatia, and is used among Bosniaks and Croats.

== Notable people ==
- Andrea Zlatar (born 1961), Croatian editor and politician

== Places ==
- Zlatar Lake, a lake in Serbia (Zlatarsko Jezero)
- Zlatar (mountain), a mountain in southwest Serbia
- Zlatar, Croatia, a town in northern Croatia

== See also ==
- Zlătar, members of a Romani Boyash community
