= Ušće Lima =

Coordinates: 43°44′06″N 19°12′31″E

- Village
- Interactive map of Ušće Lima
- Country: Bosnia and Herzegovina
- Entity: Republika Srpska
- Municipality: Višegrad
- Time zone: UTC+1 (CET)
  - Summer (DST): UTC+2 (CEST)

Ušće Lima (Serbian: Ушће Лима) is a village in the municipality of Višegrad, Bosnia and Herzegovina. The literal meaning of its name is "Mouth of the Lim".
