= Zlata (disambiguation) =

Zlata may refer to:

- Zlata, female given name of South Slavic origin
- Zlata (Râul Mare), a river in Hunedoara County, Romania
- Zlatá, Czech Republic
- Zlata, Romanian village

== See also ==
- Zlatan
- Zlatar (disambiguation)
