= Mihailo Ilić =

Serbian officer and military writer

- Born: 26 November 1845; Jagodina, Ottoman Empire
- Died: 5 September 1876 (aged 30); Mount Javor, Ottoman Empire
- Burial place: Belgrade New Cemetery
- Military career
- Allegiance: Principality of Serbia
- Service years: 1862–1876
- Rank: Major
- Conflicts: First Serbian–Turkish War †

Mihailo Ilić (Serbian Cyrillic: Михаило Илић; 26 November 1845 – 5 September 1876) was a Serbian officer, military writer, scientist and translator.

He spoke German, Russian and French and was a member of the Serbian Learned Society. His works served as textbooks for military schools. He died in the battle of Jankov vrh (1,492 m above sea level), on Mount Javor, near Ivanjica, in the First Serbian–Turkish War.

A monument to Major Ilić was erected at the Memorial Cemetery on Mount Javor on 24 June 1907.
