= Memorial Cemetery, Javor =

Memorial Cemetery, Javor Спомен гробље на Јавору Spomen groblje na Javoru
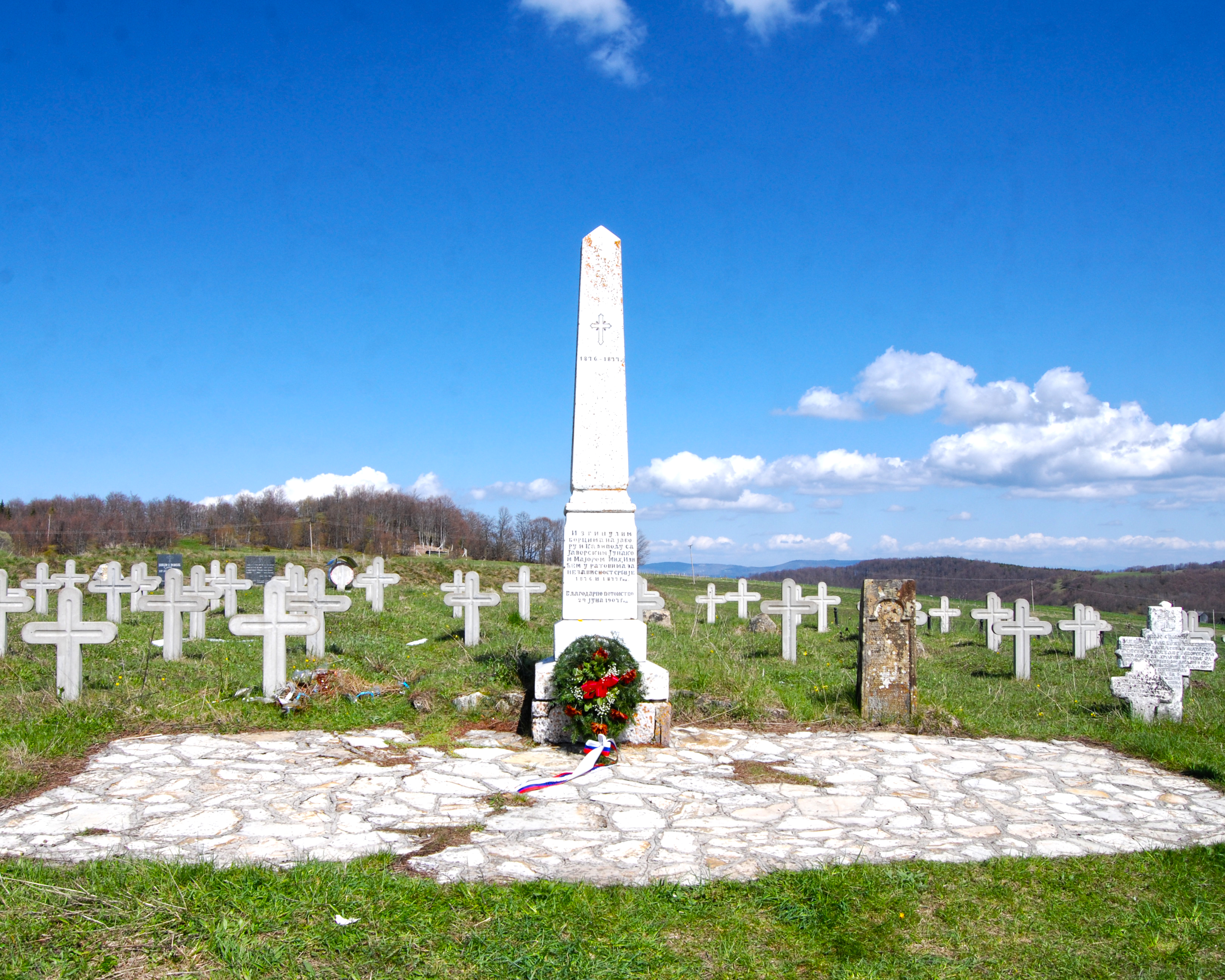

Religion
- Affiliation: Serbian Orthodox
- Leadership: Institute for Cultural Heritage Preservation Kraljevo

Location
- Location: Javor, Ivanjica, Serbia
- Interactive map of Memorial Cemetery, Javor; Спомен гробље на Јавору; Spomen groblje na Javoru
- Coordinates: 43°25′21″N 20°22′44″E

Website
- http://zavodkraljevo.rs/

Memorial Cemetery, Javor is located on Mount Javor, near the town of Ivanjica, Serbia. It is known as monumental mark "Major Ilić", in the central part of the cemetery.

The cemetery is located in the area where the decisive battle took place in the Serbo-Turkish War (1876–78), which is also known as Javor war. The cemetery is now one of the cultural monuments of great importance as immovable property, built in gratitude to Serbian soldiers killed in battle on Javor mountain in 1876. Not far from the cemetery, there is a faucet of Vasilije.

At the memorial cemetery on Javor seven thousand Serbian soldiers were buried. They died in Kalipolje on Ivanjdan, on 6 July 1876. Among the mounds in the cemetery of heroes of Javor, a monument to major Mihailo Ilić was built on 24 June 1907, who was the commander in chief during the fight and was credited for the victory of the Serbian army in the battle of Javor, and later in other battles of the Sandzak.

== Architecture ==
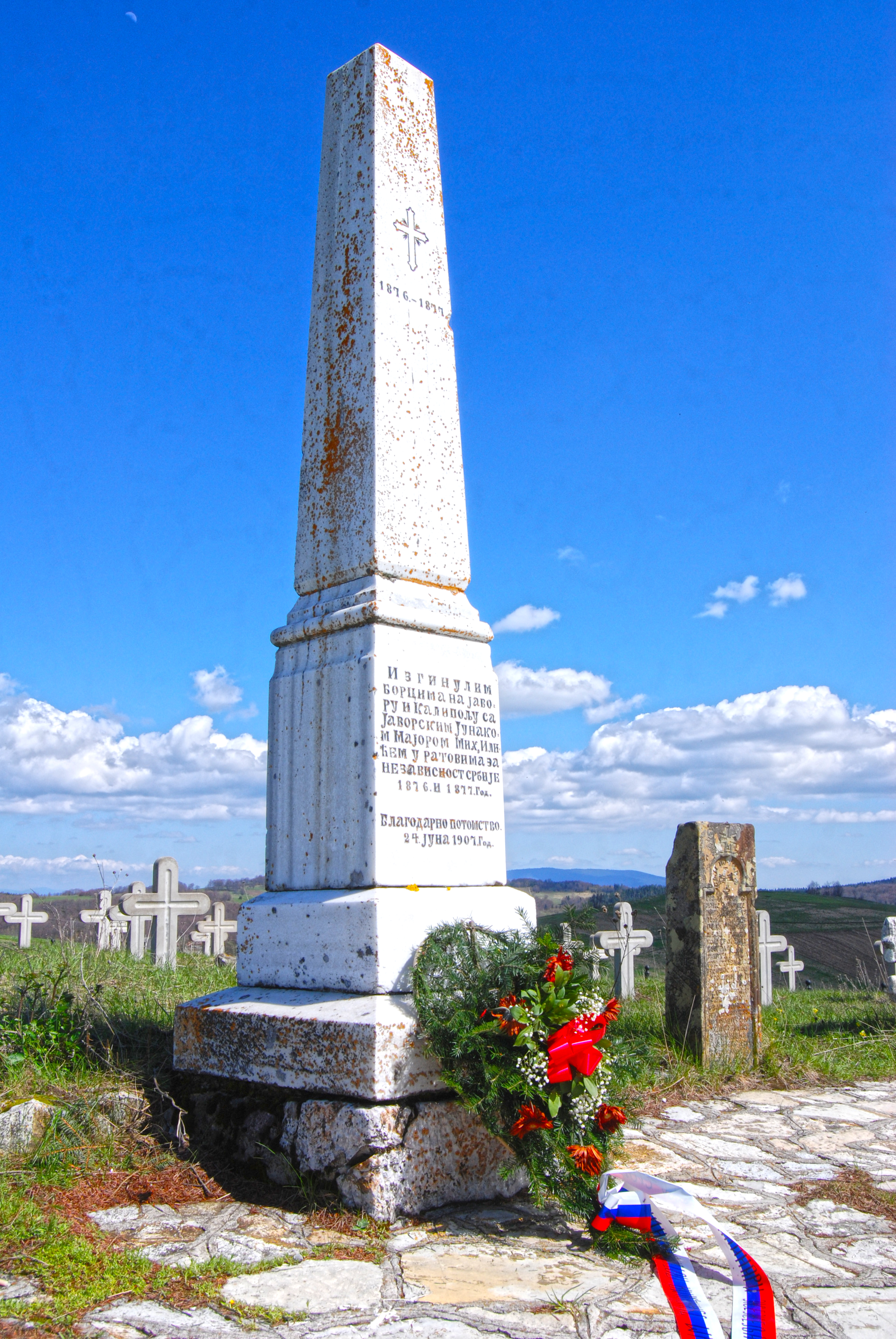
Monument to major Mihailo Ilić

The cemetery is 1.5 acres in size and seven thousand soldiers are buried there. It was well decorated to World War II and 1990 was renovated. Recently the construction of churches has started within the memorial ossuary.

Monument to Major Ilić has a square base of limestone derived and compiled in a four-stepped works. At the podium is set up with square base obelisk with pyramidal end, derived from white marble of Studenica, carved with a cross and the year.

== Battle on Kalipolje ==
Serbo-Turkish War was the struggle for independence of vassal principality Serbia, fought between the Ottoman Empire and the Principality of Serbia after the uprising in Herzegovina, which took place in 1875. This war is also known as the Javor War because the hardest battles were on the mountain of Javor.

Battle on Kalipolje began on Ivanjdan in 1876. In this battle Serbian army was destroyed. About seven thousand Serbian soldiers died, many more than that number were injured, and both Turkish soldiers were killed and wounded. Major Mihailo Ilić took command in the battle on his own initiative took. He first organized his brigade, then took another brigade under the command and managed to bypass the Turkish people around Janko's Stone, attacking them from behind and winning the battle.

Serbian soldiers killed in the battle were buried at the memorial cemetery on Javor, where a monument of hero of Javor, commander Mihailo Ilić, was built.

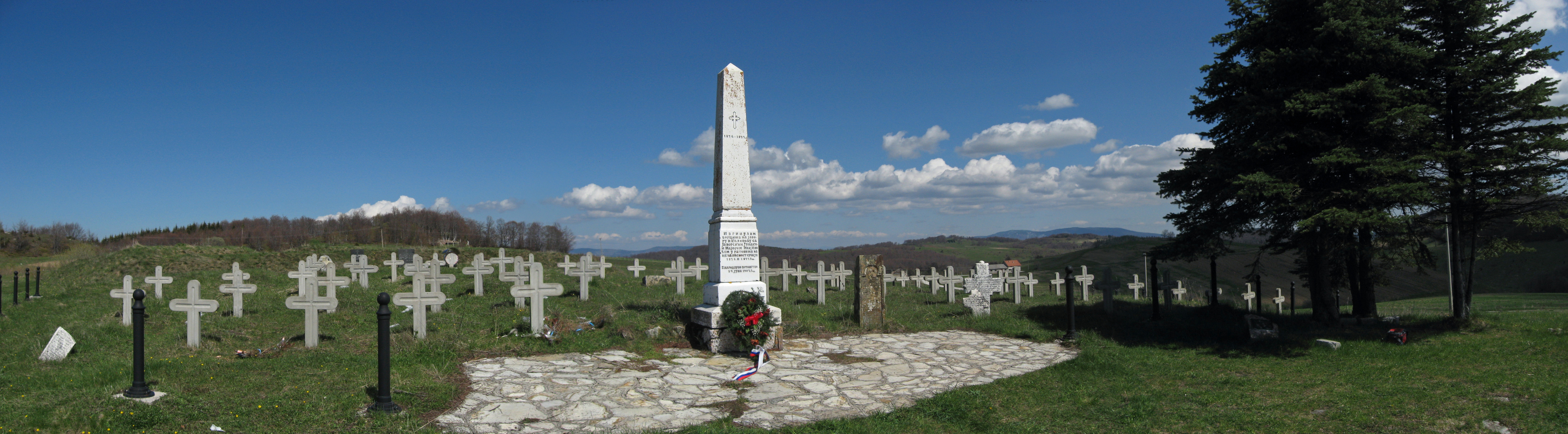
Panoramic view of the memorial

== See also ==
- Serbo-Turkish War (1876–78)
