= Uvac =

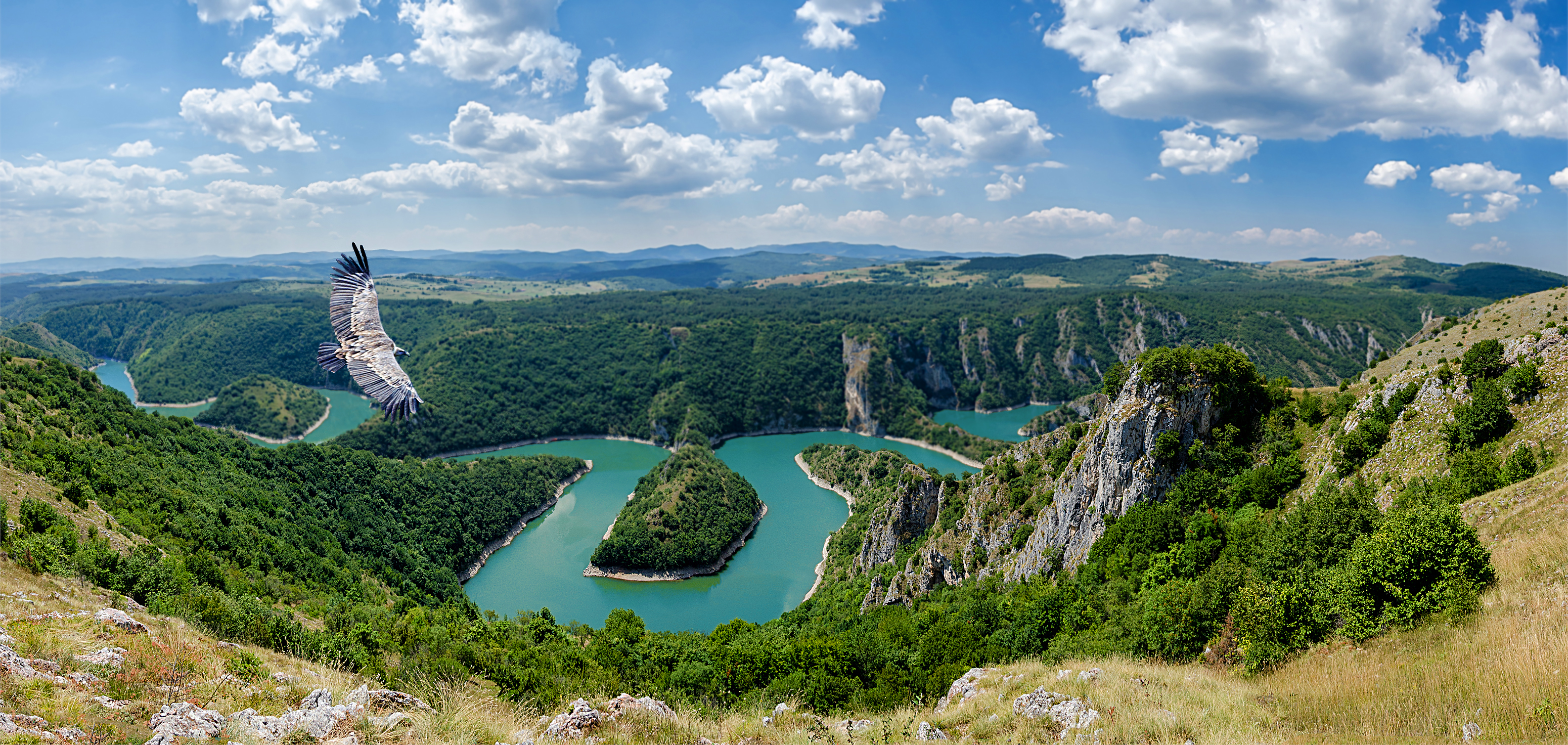

- Location within Serbia Location within Bosnia and Herzegovina

Location
- Country: Serbia, Bosnia and Herzegovina

Physical characteristics
- Source
  - location: Ninaja mountain, Pešter plateau
- Mouth
  - location: Lim river, near Priboj
  - coordinates: 43°20′58″N 19°58′13″E
- Length: 114.5 km (71 mi)
- Basin size: 1,596 km^{2} (616 sq mi)
- Discharge
  - average: 18 m^{3}/s (640 cu ft/s)

Basin features
- Progression: Lim→ Drina→ Sava→ Danube→ Black Sea

The Uvac (Serbian Cyrillic: Увац) is a trans-boundary river that rises in southwestern Serbia and flows into eastern Bosnia and Herzegovina, where it eventually joins the Lim river. Rising under Serbia's Golija mountain and Pešter plateau, the Uvac flows through southwestern Serbia before crossing into eastern Bosnia and Herzegovina where, after 115 km, it finally meets the Lim river from the right. However, before it empties into the Lim, the Uvac forms the border between the two countries for a 10 kilometers. Also, while meandering through Serbia, the Uvac loosely marks the northern border of the Raška region.

== Upper course ==
The Uvac originates at the Pešter plateau from the Ozren and Ninaja mountains, as Rasanska reka (Cyrillic: Расанска река). The stream curves around the Ninaja and Pometenik mountains, next to the villages of Tuzinje, Rasno, Dragojloviće and Gradac, where it meets Brnjička reka (Cyrillic: Брњичка река), enters the Sjenica depression and continues on the western border of the plain while receiving the right tributary Vapa (Cyrillic: Вапа) in the northern end.

Vapa is 25 kilometers long and drains an area of 496 km^{2}. It passes next to the villages of Gornja Vapa, Donja Vapa, Čedovo and Krstac, where it empties from the right into the shorter river Uvac.

== Lower course ==
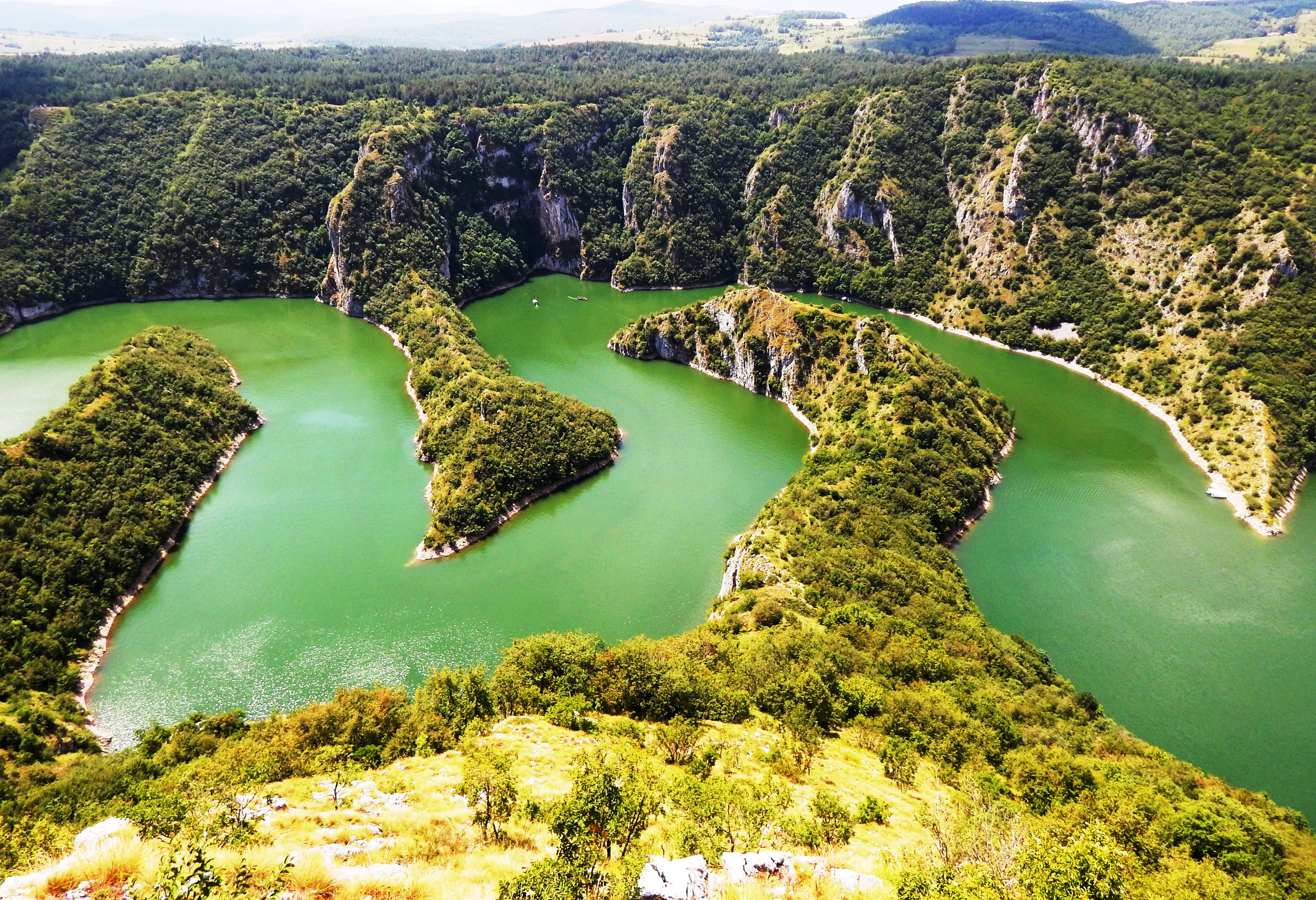
Meanders of Uvac

Bridge over Uvac

The Uvac continues to the northwest, enters the Stari Vlah region where it flows in a deep, canyon-like valley, where it receives the Kladnica river from the right and generates much power, which is used for three powerful hydroelectric power stations, each one with big artificial lake: Bistrica with Lake Radoinja, Kokin Brod with Zlatar Lake (7,3 km^{2}, altitude 400 m, depth 40 m) and Sjenica with Lake Sjenica.

In the lowest part of its course, the Uvac flows between the Zlatar and Zlatibor mountains, next to the villages of Kokin Brod and Radoinja until it reaches the Bosnian border and Varda mountain, makes a sharp, elbow turn to the south and after a short flow next to the villages of Bjelušine and Uvac (both on Bosnian side), the Uvac empties into the Lim, north of the city of Priboj.

The Uvac drains an area of 1,596 km^{2}, belongs to the Black Sea drainage basin, and it is not navigable. Its average discharge at the mouth is 18 m^{3}/s.

The river is famous for its gorge, Kanjon Uvca, the thriving colony of reintroduced griffon vultures and the Uvac Special Nature Reserve, protected since 1971. The river meanders wildly: though 115 km (71 mi) long, the straight line from the river's source to its mouth is only 40 km (25 mi).

== Sources ==
- Mala Prosvetina Enciklopedija, Third edition (1985); Prosveta; ISBN 86-07-00001-2
- Jovan Đ. Marković (1990): Enciklopedijski geografski leksikon Jugoslavije; Svjetlost-Sarajevo; ISBN 86-01-02651-6
