= Kušići =

Kušići Кушићи
- Village
- Location within Serbia
- Coordinates: 43°29′N 20°05′E
- Country: Serbia
- District: Moravica
- Municipality: Ivanjica

Area
  - Total: 29.37 km^{2} (11.34 sq mi)
- Elevation: 990 m (3,250 ft)

Population (2011)
  - Total: 498
  - Density: 17.0/km^{2} (43.9/sq mi)
- Time zone: UTC+1 (CET)
  - Summer (DST): UTC+2 (CEST)
- Postal code: 32258
- Area code: +381(0)32
- Vehicle registration: IC

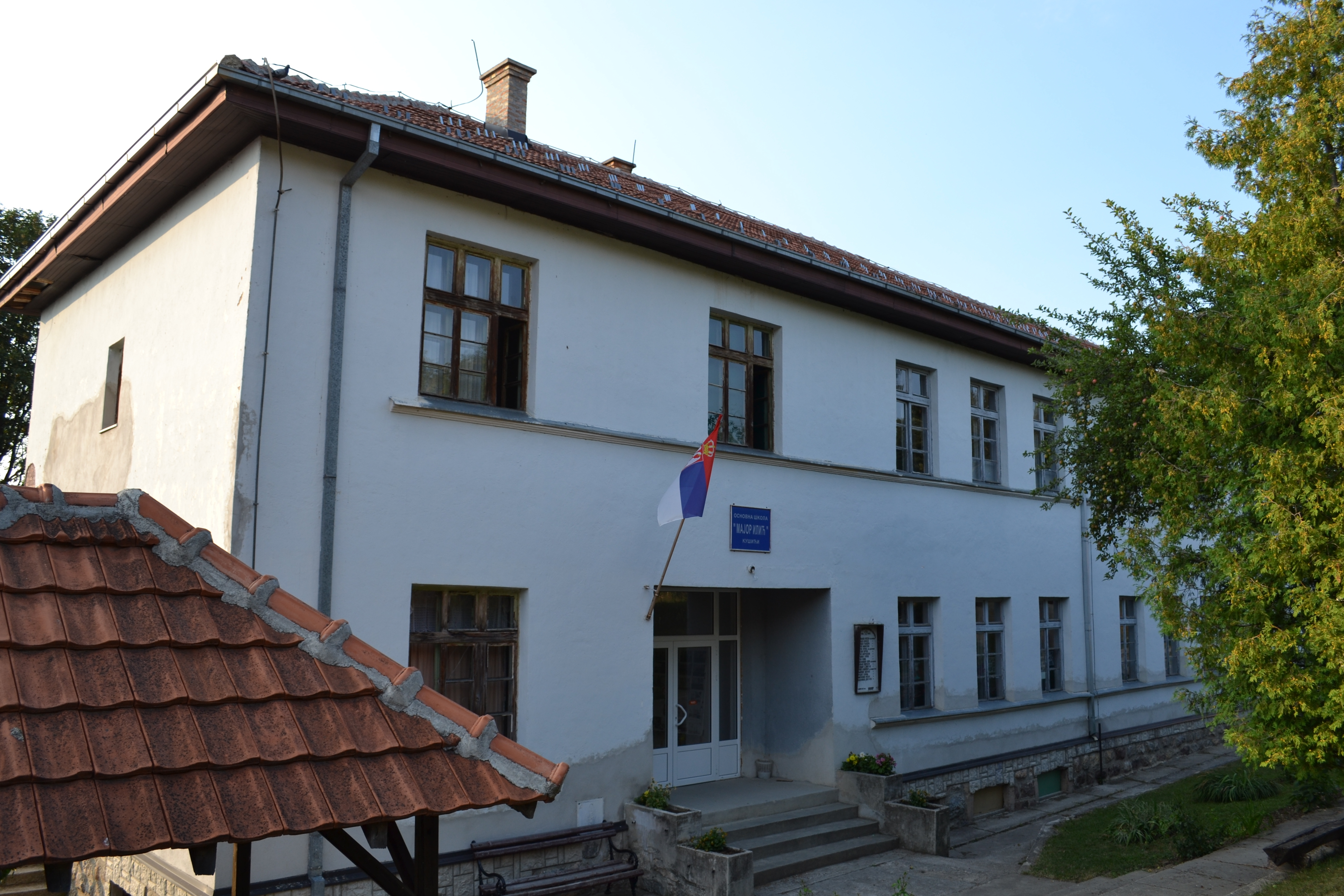

Kušići (Serbian Cyrillic: Кушићи) is a village located in the municipality of Ivanjica, southwestern Serbia. It is situated on the slopes of the Javor mountain, about 25 kilometres (16 mi) from Ivanjica and 220 kilometres (140 mi) from Belgrade and is 990m above sea level. According to the 2011 census, the village has a population of 498 inhabitants.

== Notes ==
- The nearby Kušića ditches are a memorial to the Serbo-Turkish and Balkan wars. There is also a statue to Major Ilic here.
- The village contains a church, a hotel, a post office, three shops and three pubs.
