= Hum (Pešter) =

Mountain on the border of Serbia and Montenegro

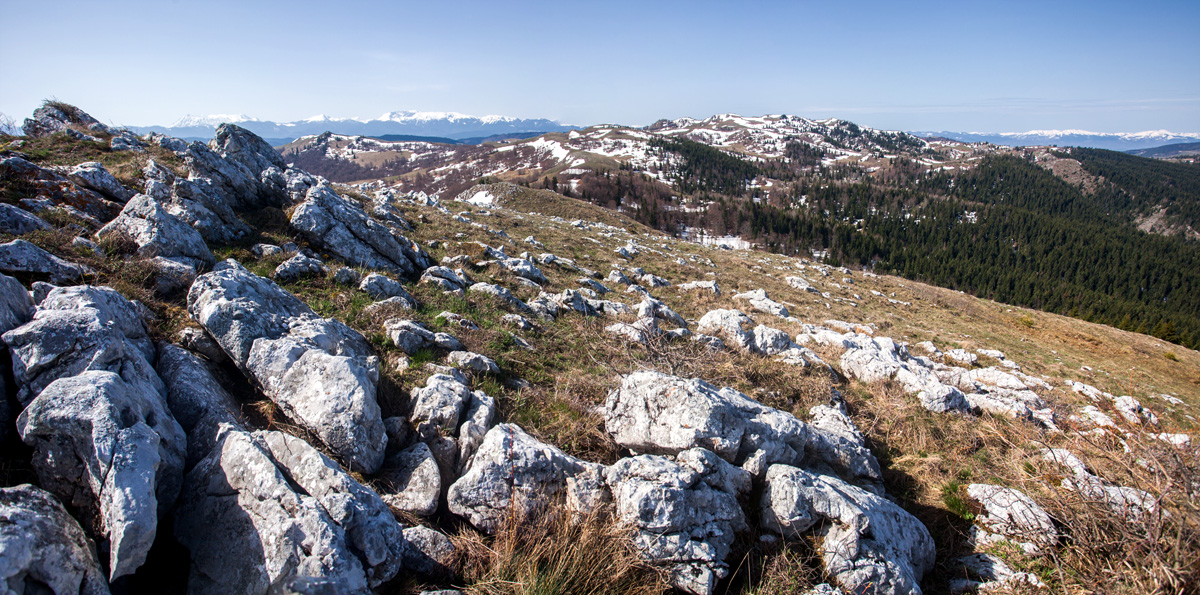

Highest point
- Elevation: 1,756 m (5,761 ft)
- Coordinates: 42°57′51″N 20°07′16″E

Geography
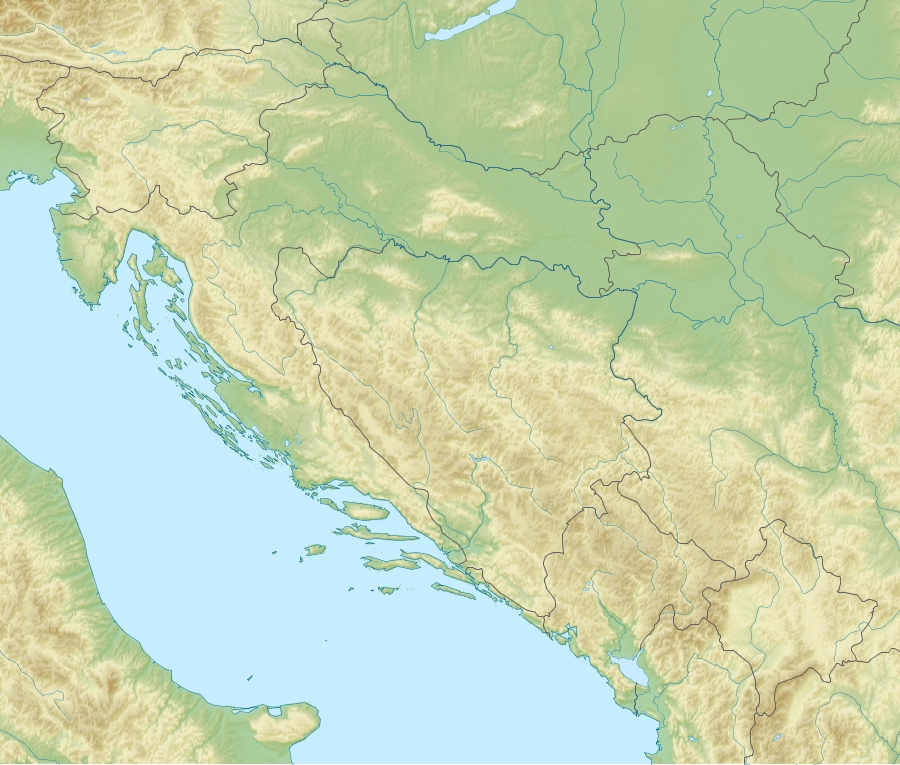
- Location within Serbia Location within Montenegro Location within Dinaric Alps
- Location: Serbia / Montenegro
- Parent range: Dinaric Alps

Hum (Serbian Cyrillic: Хум) is a mountain on the border of Serbia and Montenegro, between towns of Sjenica and Rožaje, on the eastern edge of Pešter plateau. Its highest peak, Krstača, has an elevation of 1,756 meters above sea level. Its name, the same as medieval region Hum (older Serbian Hlm), probably is the source for the ancient toponymy for Balkans as Haemus.

== See also ==
- List of mountains in Serbia
