= Žilindar =

Mountain in Serbia and Montenegro

- Location within Serbia

Highest point
- Elevation: 1,616 m (5,302 ft)
- Coordinates: 43°02′34″N 20°00′44″E

Geography
- Location: Serbia / Montenegro
- Parent range: Dinaric Alps

Žilindar (Serbian Cyrillic: Жилиндар) is a mountain on the border of Serbia and Montenegro, between towns of Sjenica and Berane, on the central edge of Pešter plateau. Its highest peak Žilindar has an elevation of 1,616 meters above sea level.

== See also ==
- List of mountains in Serbia
