= Upper Kolašin =

Region in Kolašin, Montenegro

Upper Kolasin (South Slavic languages: Gornji Kolašin, Горњи Колашин), is a historic region in the present-day municipality of Kolašin in Montenegro. It is situated around the picturesque Tara River.

== Demographics ==
According to the census of 2003, the area of Upper Kolašin has about 10,000 people, all of which are ethnic Serbs and Montenegrins.

Prior to the Treaty of Berlin in 1878, Muslims formed a majority in Upper Kolašin. However, all of them were expelled by 1886, opening up space for the settlement of ethnic Serbs and Montenegrins.

Expulsion of Muslims from Upper Kolašin took place in three waves:

- 1858 - Following the Battle of Grahovac, Montenegro annexed Gornje Lipovo and Recine;
- 1878 - According to the Treaty of Berlin, Montenegro annexed the town of Kolasin and all adjacent villages, all the way to Prepran, along both sides of the Tara River. The town was officially surrendered on October 4, 1878;
- 1886 - Montenegro annexed those villages in the North that were promised to it by the Treaty of Berlin, but whose Muslim population rejected immediate occupation by Montenegro, namely Štitarica, Podbišće, Bjelojevići, Gornja and Donja Polja, Bistrica, and Dobrilovina.

Effectively, the entire area of Upper Kolašin was ethnically cleansed of Muslim by July 2, 1886.
