= Akmačići =

Coordinates: 43.4242°N 19.8703°E

- Village
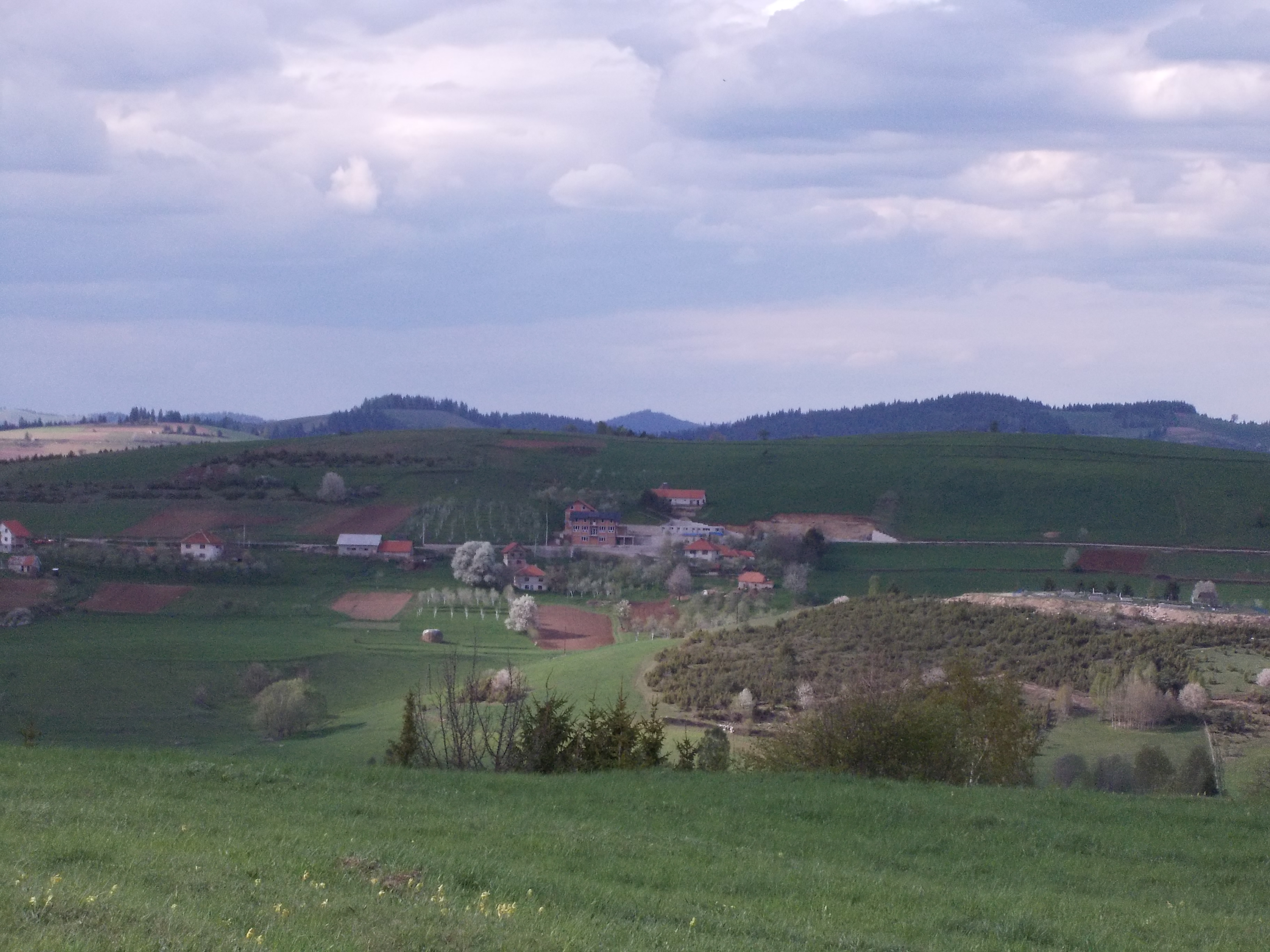
- View of Akmačići
- Interactive map of Akmačići
- Country: Serbia
- District: Zlatibor District
- Municipality: Nova Varoš

Population (2022)
  - Total: 303
- Time zone: UTC+1 (CET)
  - Summer (DST): UTC+2 (CEST)

Akmačići is a village in the municipality of Nova Varoš, western Serbia. According to the 2022 census, the village has a population of 303 people.
