= Giljeva =

Mountain in Serbia

- Location within Serbia

Highest point
- Elevation: 1,617 m (5,305 ft)
- Coordinates: 43°10′45″N 19°54′24″E

Geography
- Location: Southwestern Serbia
- Parent range: Dinaric Alps

Giljeva (Serbian Cyrillic: Гиљева) is a mountain in southwestern Serbia, on the western edge of Pešter plateau, near the town of Sjenica. Its highest peak Jelenak has an elevation of 1,617 m (5,305 ft) above sea level.

== See also ==
- List of mountains in Serbia
