= Jarut =

Mountain in Serbia

- Location within Serbia

Highest point
- Elevation: 1,428 m (4,685 ft)
- Coordinates: 43°03′54″N 20°14′42″E

Geography
- Location: Southwestern Serbia
- Parent range: Dinaric Alps

Jarut (Serbian Cyrillic: Јарут) is a mountain in southwestern Serbia, surrounding the Pešter plateau, near the town of Tutin. Its highest peak, Markov vrh, has an elevation of 1,428 meters above sea level.

== See also ==
- List of mountains in Serbia
