= Zlatar (mountain) =

Mountain in Serbia

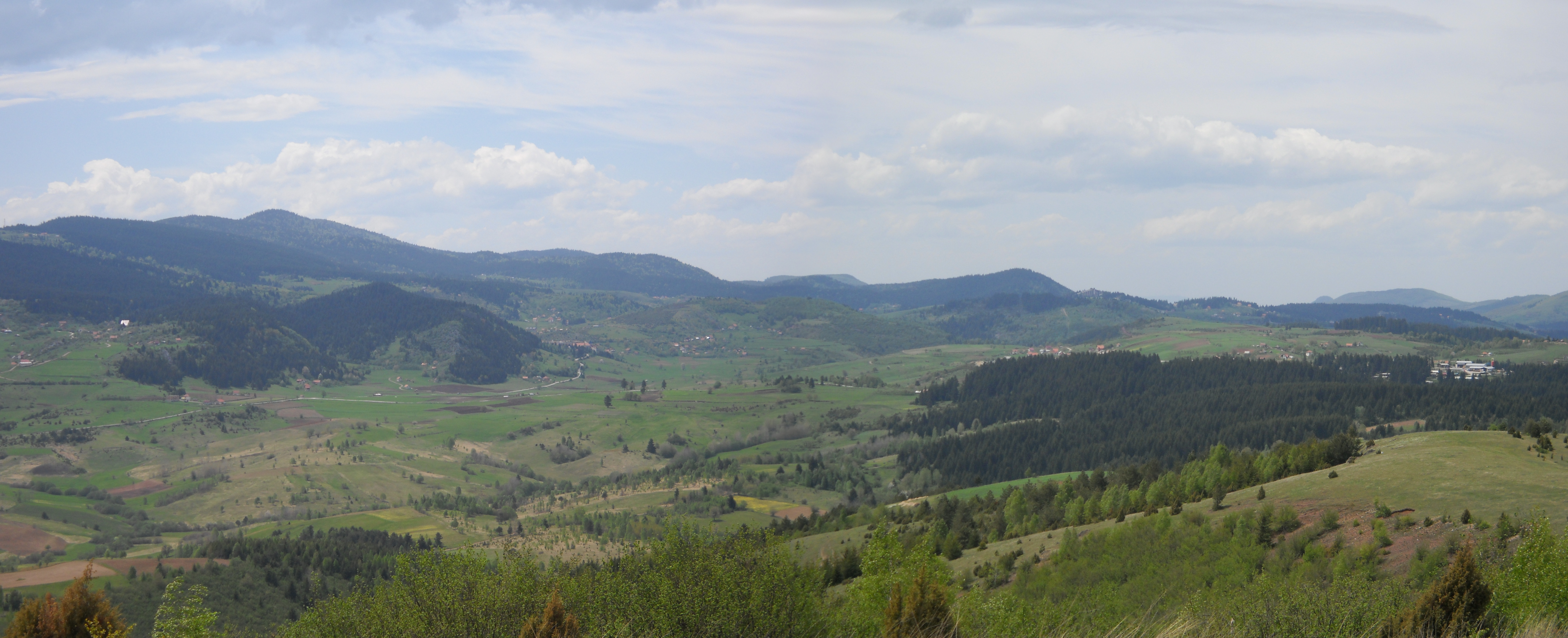

Highest point
- Elevation: 1,627 m (5,338 ft)
- Coordinates: 43°24′32″N 19°47′33″E

Geography
- Location within Serbia
- Location: Southwestern Serbia
- Parent range: Dinaric Alps

Zlatar (Serbian Cyrillic: Златар, pronounced [zlǎtaːr]) is a mountain in southwestern Serbia, lying between towns of Prijepolje and Nova Varoš. Its highest peak, Velika krseva, has an elevation of 1,627 meters. Zlatar is bounded by the rivers Uvac, Lim, Mileševka and Bistrica, and has a total of four artificial lakes – Zlatar Lake, Uvac Lake, Potpeć Lake, and Radoinjsko Lake. Its mountainous climate with significant Mediterranean influence, dense pine forests, and a high number of sunny days, is suitable for medicinal purposes and altitude training. At the elevation of 1,237 meters, there is a Special Rehabilitation Hospital "Zlatar" with 330 beds.

== See also ==
- List of mountains in Serbia
