= Zlatar Lake =

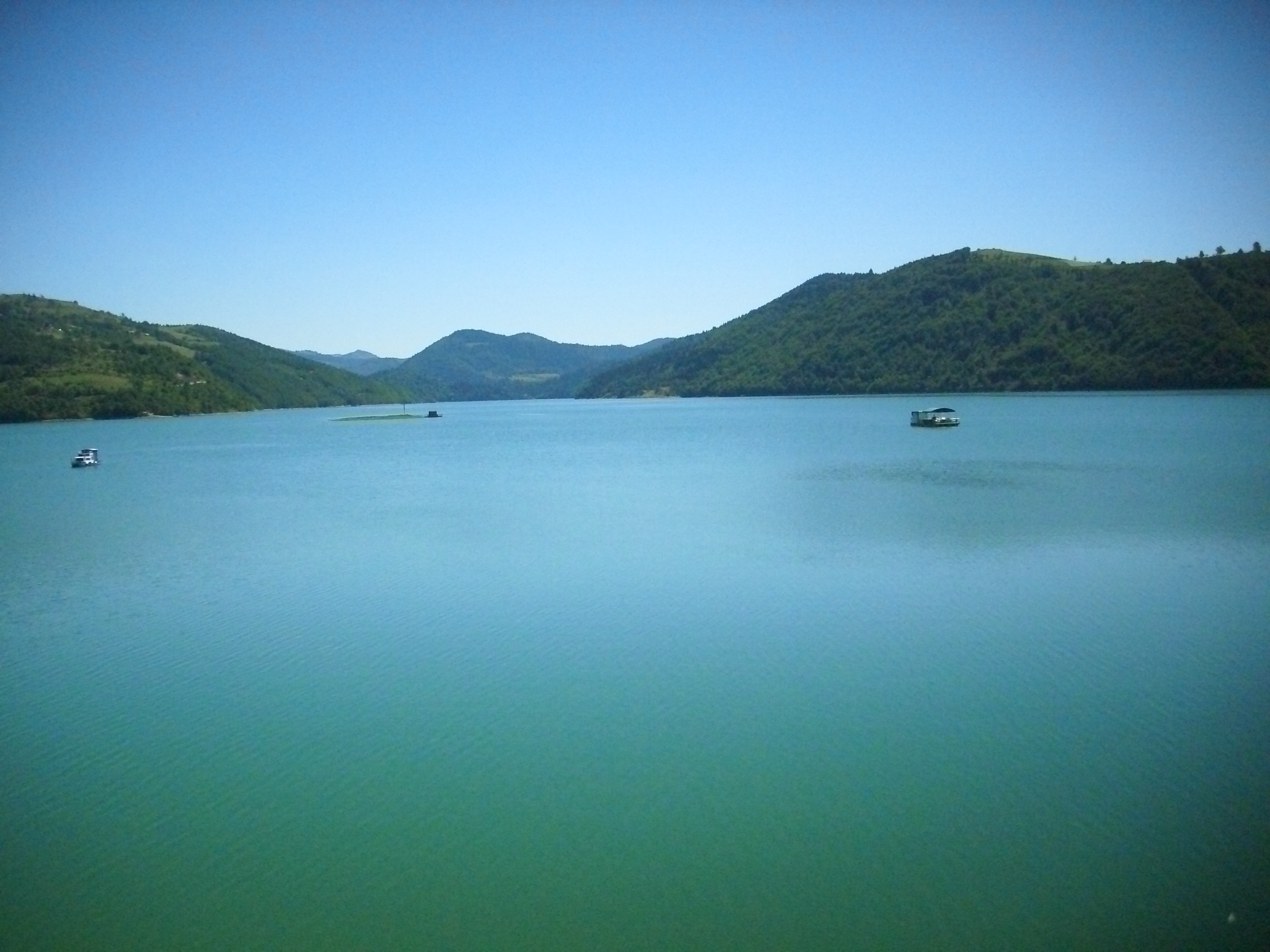
- Zlatar Lake, view from the dam

- Location within Serbia
- Location: Southwest Serbia
- Coordinates: 43°30′31″N 19°50′19″E
- Lake type: Reservoir
- Basin countries: Serbia
- Surface area: 7.25 km^{2} (2.80 sq mi)
- Max. depth: 75 m (246 ft)
- Water volume: 165 million cubic metres (5.8×10^{9} cu ft)
- Surface elevation: 880 m (2,890 ft)

Zlatar Lake (Златарско језеро), or Kokin Brod Lake (Језеро Кокин Брод) is an artificial lake located among the mountains of Zlatibor and Zlatar 15 km from the town of Nova Varoš. The lake was created in the 1960s after the construction of a dam on the Uvac river, and covers an area of 7.25 square kilometers and reaches a maximum depth of 75 meters.

The region has a continental-Mediterranean climate and is an attractive destination for holidays, recreation and water-sports. The lake is suitable for treatment of cardiovascular diseases. The lake rests 880 meters above sea level.

It is part of the Uvac Special Nature Reserve.

== See also ==
- Uvac Lake
