= Ozren (Pešter) =

Mountain in Serbia

- Location within Serbia

Highest point
- Elevation: 1,693 m (5,554 ft)
- Coordinates: 43°14′42″N 19°50′47″E

Geography
- Location: Southwestern Serbia
- Parent range: Dinaric Alps

Ozren (Serbian Cyrillic: Озрен, pronounced [ɔ̂zrɛn]) is a mountain in southwestern Serbia, near the town of Sjenica. Its highest peak, Orlovača, has an elevation of 1,693 meters above sea level. It is one of the mountains which surround the Pešter plateau. Spring of the Uvac river is located at the foothills of Ozren.

== See also ==
- List of mountains in Serbia
