= Potpeć Lake =

Reservoir in Serbia

- Потпећко језеро (Serbian)
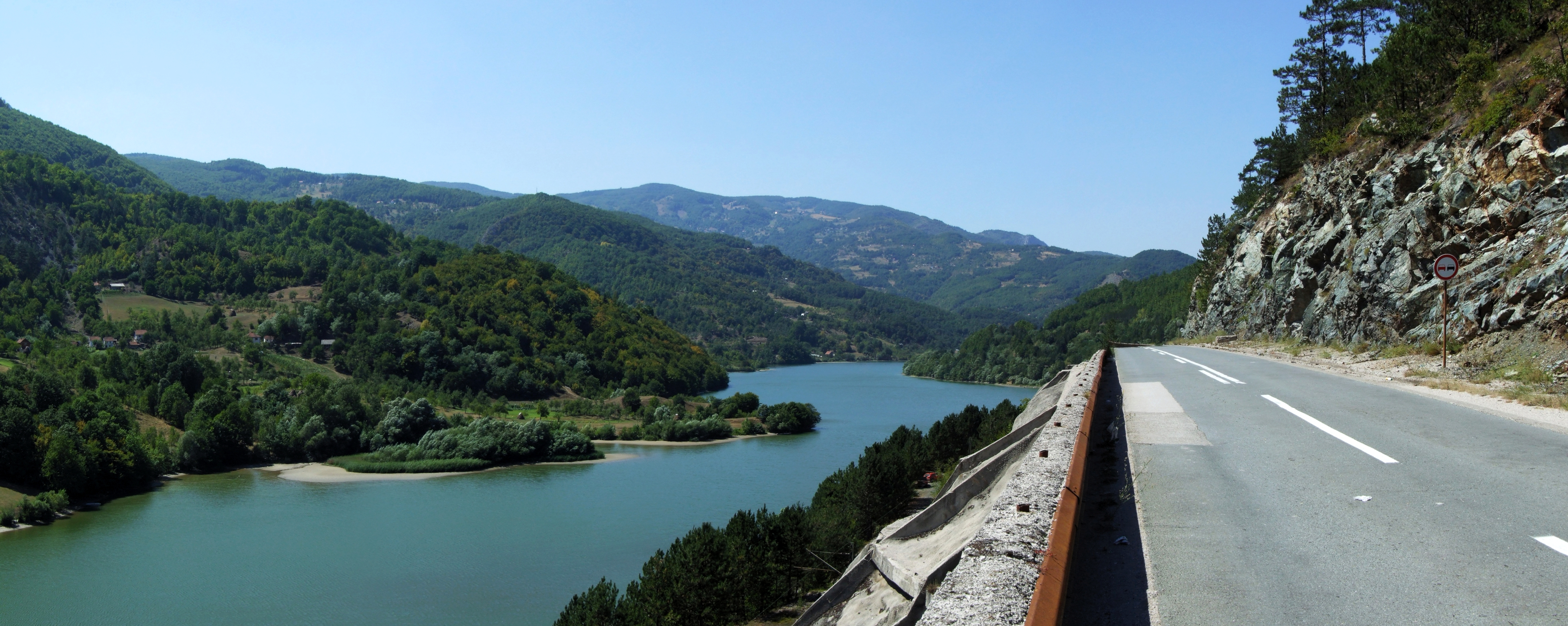

- Location within Serbia
- Coordinates: 43°30′31″N 19°35′42″E
- Catchment area: 3,605 km^{2} (1,392 sq mi)
- Max. length: 20 km (12 mi)
- Surface area: 7 km^{2} (2.7 sq mi)
- Max. depth: 40 m (130 ft)
- Water volume: 0.044 km^{3} (0.011 cu mi)
- Surface elevation: 435.6 m (1,429 ft)

Potpeć Lake (Serbian: Потпећко језеро, sometimes rendered Potpecko Lake) is reservoir on the Lim River, in Serbia. It was created for hydroelectric power purposes by a concrete gravity dam, 46 m tall and 215 m long, at 43°31′21″N 19°34′36″E. After heavy rains in January 2021, masses of floating plastic garbage threatened to clog the dam's intakes.

Considering that the Belgrade-Bar railway passes along the dam and the main road leading from Belgrade to the Montenegrin coast, it has a distinct potential for the development of transit tourism, which is currently underused. In addition, it is suitable for active tourism and fishing. Zander, catfish and trout can be caught in the lake.
