= Jadovnik =

Mountain in Serbia

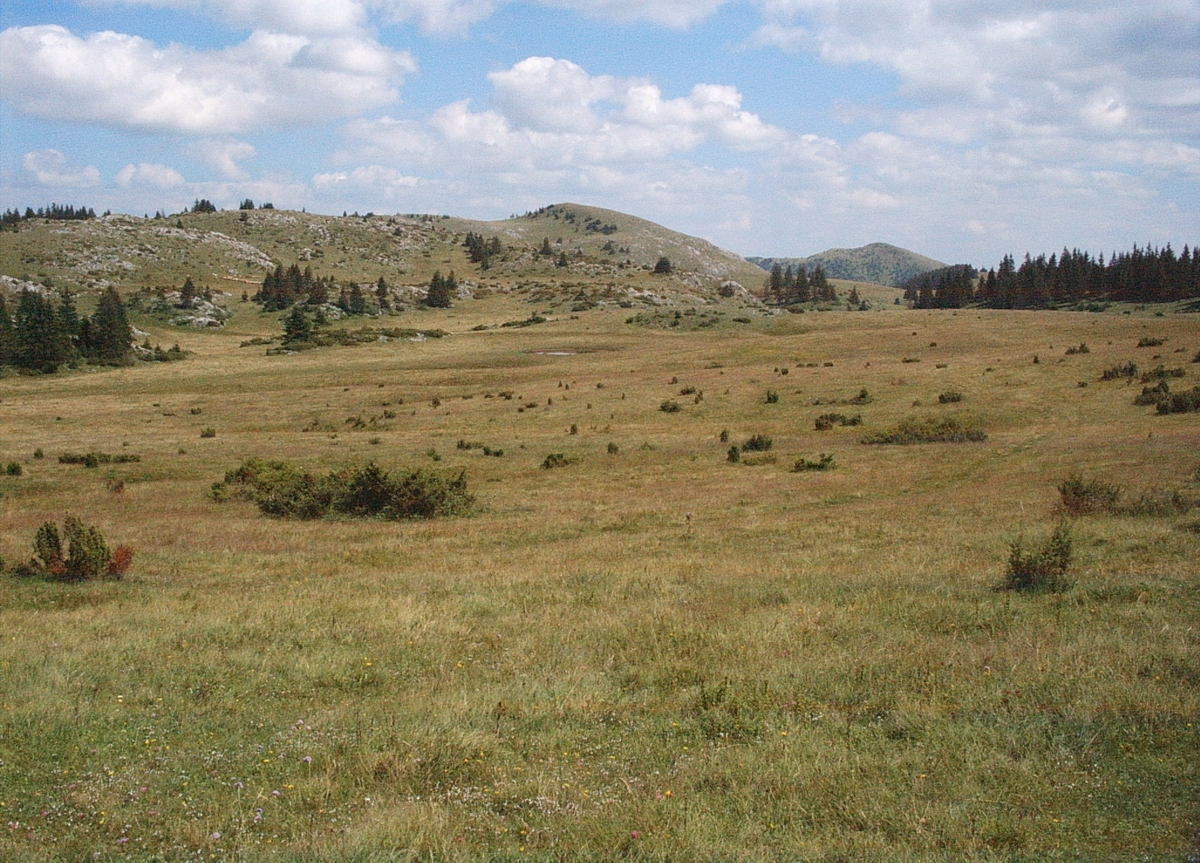

Highest point
- Elevation: 1,734 m (5,689 ft)
- Coordinates: 43°16′36″N 19°50′00″E

Geography
- Location within Serbia
- Location: Southwestern Serbia
- Parent range: Dinaric Alps

Jadovnik (Serbian Cyrillic: Јадовник, pronounced [jâdɔːʋniːk]) is a mountain in southwestern Serbia, on the western edge of the Pešter plateau, between the towns of Prijepolje and Sjenica. Its highest peak, Katunić, has an elevation of 1,734 meters above sea level.

== See also ==
- List of mountains in Serbia
