= Ninaja =

Mountain in Serbia

- Location within Serbia

Highest point
- Elevation: 1,462 m (4,797 ft)
- Coordinates: 43°10′08″N 20°13′19″E

Geography
- Location: Southwestern Serbia
- Parent range: Dinaric Alps

Ninaja (Serbian Cyrillic: Нинаја) is a mountain in southwestern Serbia, between cities of Novi Pazar and Sjenica. Its highest peak, Homar, has an elevation of 1,462 meters above sea level.

== See also ==
- List of mountains in Serbia
