= Javor (Serbia) =

Mountain in Serbia

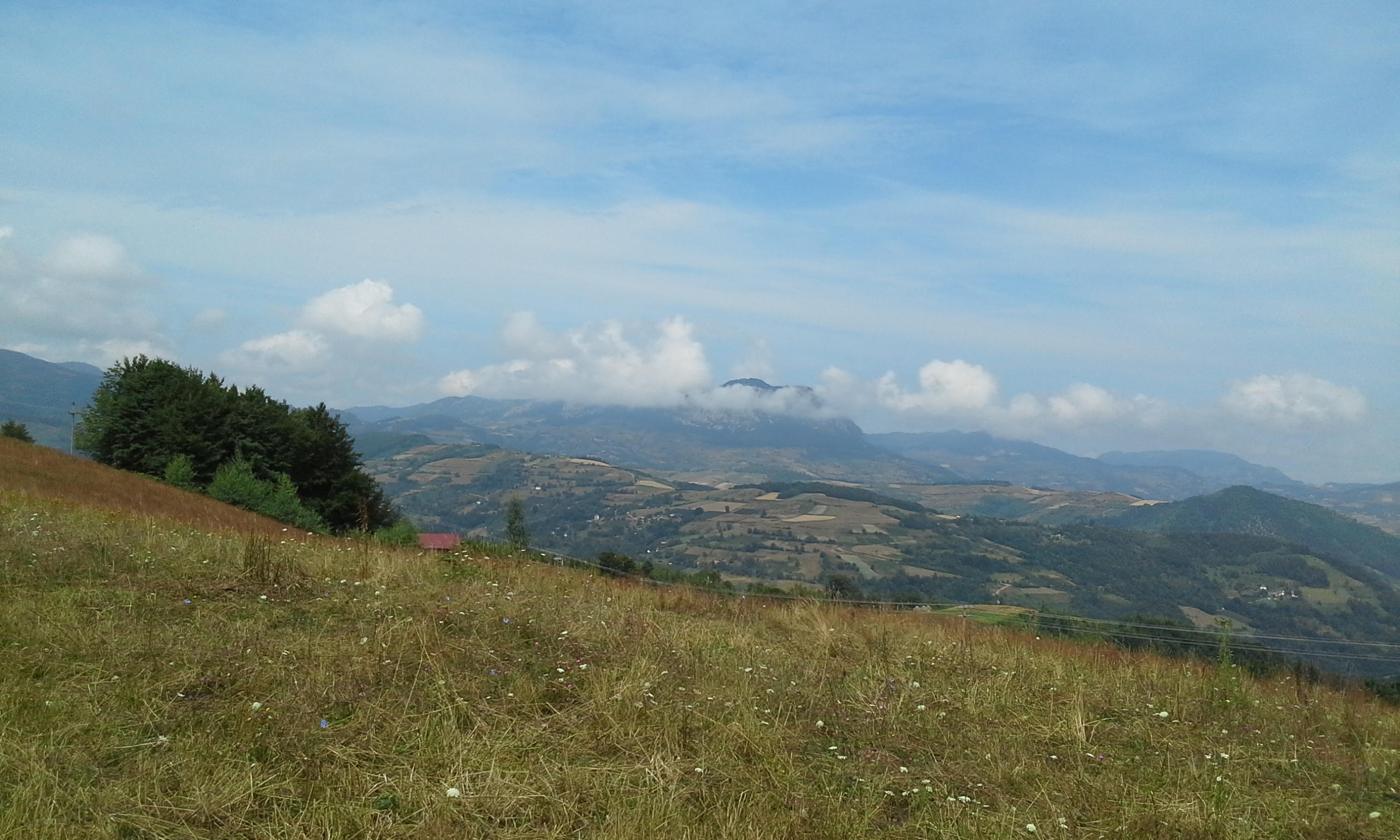

Highest point
- Elevation: 1,519 m (4,984 ft)
- Coordinates: 43°26′29″N 20°03′16″E

Geography
- Location within Serbia
- Location: Western Serbia
- Parent range: Dinaric Alps

Climbing
- Easiest route: Hike from Kušići

Javor (Serbian Cyrillic: Јавор, pronounced [jâʋɔr]) is a mountain in southwestern Serbia, between towns of Sjenica and Ivanjica. Its highest peak, Vasilin vrh, has an elevation of 1,519 meters above sea level. There is a Memorial Cemetery on the mountain.

== See also ==
- List of mountains in Serbia
