= List of lakes of Serbia =

Most lakes of Serbia are artificial, created by damming numerous rivers of Serbia for the purpose of obtaining hydroelectric power or as water reservoirs. Natural lakes in the Pannonian Plain are shallow, occurring as river arms or bogs, or by aeolian erosion. Few natural lakes in the mountains are of glacial origin.

== List of lakes ==
The list of lakes of Serbia, excluding the territory of Kosovo.

Lake	Max. area (km^{2})	Alt. (m)	Depth (m)	Type, characteristics	Photo
Đerdap Lake	253	70	92	artificial lake, part of hydroelectric reservoirs (Iron Gate I, Iron Gate II, Danube), shared with Romania.	
Bečej Lake	18			artificial, fish pond	
Vlasina Lake	16	1,213	22	semi-artificial, peat bog turned into reservoir (Vlasina River)	
Ečka fish pond lakes	15.4		1.3	artificial, fish pond, includes four lakes: White Lake of 5km; and Joca Lake of 5km; Koča Lake; Mika Lake.	
Barje Lake	13			artificial	
Perućac Lake	12.4	290	70	artificial lake, hydroelectric reservoir (Drina), also called Bajina Bašta, shared with Bosnia and Herzegovina	
Gazivoda Lake	11.9	693	105	artificial, industrial reservoir (Ibar)	
Zasavica	11.5		10	natural, bog, ancient arm of the Sava	
Carska bara	11			natural, bog	
Gruža Lake	9.19			artificial, industrial reservoir (Gruža (river)), Sea of Šumadija	
Zvornik Lake	8.1	140	28	artificial, hydroelectric reservoir (Drina); Shared with Bosnia & Herzegovina	
Zlatar Lake	7.3	880	75	artificial, hydroelectric reservoir (Uvac)	
Potpeć Lake	7	436	40	artificial, hydroelectric reservoir (Lim)	
Obedska bara	7	72	12	natural, bog, ancient arm of Sava	
Kapetanski Rit	6.13			artificial, fish pond	
Uvac/Sjenica Lake	5	985	35	artificial, hydroelectric reservoir (Uvac)	
Palić Lake	5.6	101	3.5	semi-natural, aeolian lake, artificially preserved	
Zavoj Lake	5.53	612	60	artificial, originally created by landslide, turned into hydroelectrical reservoir (Visočica)	
Koviljski rit	5.5			natural, marsh	
Uzdin Pond	5.5			artificial, fish pond, located in the village of Uzdin.	
Bovan Lake	5		7	artificial, industrial reservoir (Sokobanjska Moravica)	
Zaovine Lake	4.3	?	?	artificial, reservoir (Bajina Bašta II), located in Zaovine.	
Silver Lake	4	70	8	natural, dammed arm of the Danube	
Krupac Lake	4	?	?	located in Krupac, Pirot.	
Zlatica	3.9			artificial, fish pond, formerly Jazovo	
Opolje Lake	3.7	980		semi-artificial, originally karst lake, turned into industrial reservoir	
Ludaš Lake	3.68	101	2.5	natural, eolian lake, also known as Ludoš.	
Fish pond Jedinstvo	3.5			artificial, fish pond	
Lake Ćelije	3.35	277	41	artificial, water supply (Rasina)	
Okanj	3			natural, bog, oxbow lake.	
Rovni Lake	3.2			artificial, industrial reservoir (Jablanica)	
Vrutci Lake	2.66	?	?	?	
Novi Kneževac fish pond	2.63			artificial, fish pond	
Velebit fish pond	2.58			artificial, fish pond	
Zobnatica Lake	2.55			artificial, industrial reservoir (Krivaja)	
Futog fish pond	2.1			artificial, fish pond, formerly DTD	
Veliko Blato	2			natural, bog, within Pančevački Rit, located in Krnjača.	
Gračanica Lake	2		29	artificial, industrial reservoir (Gračanka)	
Sutjeska fish pond	2			artificial, fish pond	
Susek fish pond	2			artificial, fish pond	
Kolut fish pond	1.82			artificial, fish pond	
Kamenica Lake	1.7	?	?	located in Valjevska Kamenica.	
Međuvršje Lake	1.5	273	23	artificial, hydroelectrical reservoir (West Morava)	
Bela Crkva lakes	1.5	89		artificial, six lakes in close proximity, former gravel exploitation sites.	
Veliko Kopovo	1.45			natural, bog	
Srpski Miletić fish pond	1.14			artificial, fish pond	
Grlište Lake	1.1	?	?	located in Grlište.	
Rusanda	1.1	82	1.5	natural, saline mud lake, located in the village of Melenci.	
Krajkovac Lake	1	450		artificial, reservoir, near Krajkovac, Merošina	
Jegrička	0.98			artificial, fish pond	
Sava Lake	0.8			natural, dammed arm of Sava, see also Ada Ciganlija.	
Paljuvi Viš	0.8 (150 ha)			artificial, industrial reservoir (Klanica), located in the village of Paljuvi.	
Divljana Lake	0.7	?	?	located in Divljana and Mokra, Bela Palanka.	
Borkovac Lake	0.69		6	artificial, industrial reservoir (Borkovac)	
Pavlovci Lake also called Kudoš	0.65			artificial, industrial reservoir	
Garaši Lake	0.65			artificial, industrial reservoir, located in the village of Garaši.	
Moharač Lake	0.55	?	?	artificial, reservoir	
Bešenovo Lake or "White Stone" (Beli Kamen)	0.6		57	artificial, submerged quarry near Bešenovo	
Radoinja Lake	0.55		30	Hydroelectric reservoir (Uvac river)	
Šelovrenac	0.55 (55 ha)	?	?	artificial lake located by the village of Maradik.	
Dobrodol Lake	0.45				
Ribnica Lake	0.4	968		artificial, industrial-recreational reservoir (Crni Rzav)	
Ljukovo Lake	0.35	?	?	artificial, created in 1976, located in Jarkovci.	
Markovac Lake	0.3			artificial	
Vranješ Lake	0.3				
Zaova Lake	0.3	?	?	artificial lake, located by the Zaova Monastery.	
Bor Lake	0.3	438	50	reservoir	
Rgotina Lake	0.3	?	?	artificial, created in 1978, located in Rgotina.	
Oblačina Lake	0.28	280		natural lake near Oblačina, Merošina.	
Šatrinačko Lake also called Međaš/Međeš	0.26	?	?	artificial, created in 1984, located in Irig, Serbia.	
Šumarice Lake	0.22	?	?	artificial lake in Kragujevac, created for decorative measures for the Šumarice Park.	
Bloody Lake (Serbia)	0.2	?	?	located in Subotica municpality.	
Debeljača Lake	0.13	?	?	located in Debeljača.	
Blace Lake	0.12	?	?	?	
Bruje Lake or Erdevik Lake.	0.17				
Očaga	0.12			artificial	
Pariguz	0.12			artificial, reservoir, located in Resnik.	
Taložnik	0.12			artificial, auxiliary to Sava Lake, see Ada Ciganlija	
Rabrovac Lake	0.1				
Aleksandrovac Lake	0.08			artificial, part of irrigation system of South Morava near Vranje	
Brestovac Lake	0.08	?	?	artificial, located in Brestovac, Bojnik.	
Duboki Potok Lake	0.07			artificial, reservoir on eponymous creek near Barajevo	
Goli Kamen	0.05	550		artificial, reservoir near Vučkovica, Guča	
Ada Safari	0.04			artificial, fishing resort	
Dulene Lake	0.03	435	7	artificial, Abandoned water reservoir near Dulene, Kragujevac	
Bubanj Lake	0.03	?	?	artificial but natural creation in the 1970s, located in Kragujevac.	
Bela Reka	0.02			artificial	
Ostojićevo fish pond				fish pond	
Celeruša				natural oxbow lake, old meander of Tisa River near Čoka	
Trešnja	0.003			artificial	
Rakina bara	0.002		2	natural, karst sinkhole near Sremčica, Belgrade	
Jarevac lake				artificial	
Grza Lake					
Bukulja Lake
Vezirovac
Vetrensko Lake	?	?	?	artificial lake, located in Babušnica.	
Vrmdža Lake	?	?	?	artificial, originally sinkhole	
Vukošić Pond	?	?	?	located in Vukošić.	
Grošnica Lake	?	?	?	located 6km south of Kragujevac.	
Semeteš Lake	?	?	?		
Deliblato Lake (Kraljevac Reserve)	?	?	?	located within Kraljevac special nature reserve.	
Zlatibor Lake	?	?	?	located in Zlatibor.	
Zobnatica Lake	?	?	?	located in Zobnatica.	
Jarevac Lake	?	?	?	located on the Tara mountain.	
Jovac Lake	?	?	?	located in Jovac (Vladičin Han).	
Kladovo Lakes	?	?	?	located in Kladovo.	
Kudreč	?	?	?	artificial, created in 1965, located in Smederevska Palanka.	
Ledinci Lake	?	?	?	artificial, created after 1999 NATO bombing, located in Stari Ledinci. Temporarily emptied in 2009.	
Lisina Lake	?	?	?	artificial, created in 1978.	
Petnica Lake	?	?	?	artificial, created in 1990, located in Petnica.	

- Note: in Serbian, the word for lake (jezero) is almost always a part of the lake's name. If the name is given as a noun, jezero precedes it (Jezero Gazivode), if the name is given as an adjective (usually with the -ko suffix), jezero follows it (Vlasinsko jezero).

== See also ==
- List of rivers of Serbia
- List of mountains of Serbia

== Sources ==
- Jovan Đ. Marković (1990): Enciklopedijski geografski leksikon Jugoslavije; Svjetlost-Sarajevo; ISBN 86-01-02651-6
