= Gornja Rasovača =

Gornja Rasovača Горња Расовача
- Village
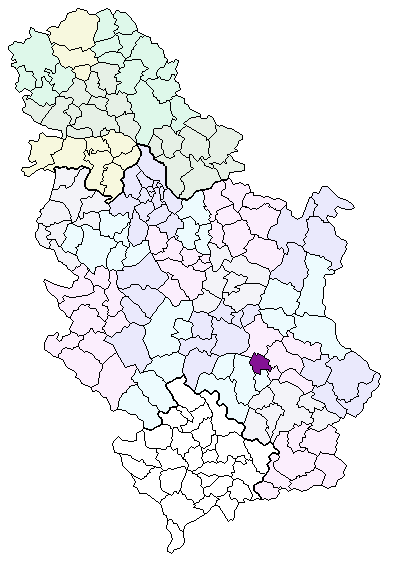
- Location of Merošina municipality in Serbia

- Location within Serbia
- Country: Serbia
- District: Nišava
- Municipality: Merošina
- Time zone: UTC+1 (CET)
  - Summer (DST): UTC+2 (CEST)

Gornja Rasovača is a village situated in Merošina municipality in Serbia.
