= Biljeg =

Biljeg Биљег
- Village
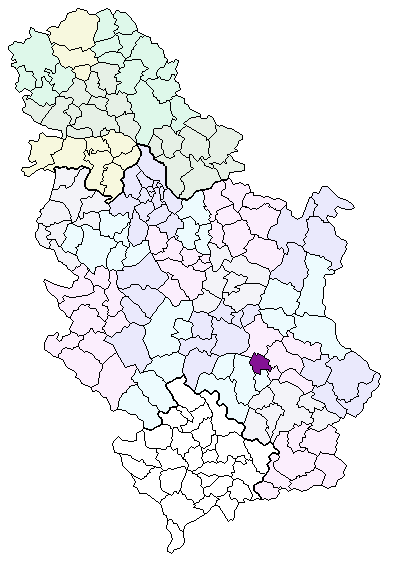
- Location of Merošina municipality in Serbia

- Location within Serbia
- Country: Serbia
- District: Nišava
- Municipality: Merošina

Population (2022)
  - Total: 445
- Time zone: UTC+1 (CET)
  - Summer (DST): UTC+2 (CEST)

Biljeg (Serbian: Биљег) is a village in Serbia in the municipality Merošina in Nisava district. According to the census of 2022, there were 445 people (according to the census of 1991, there were 524 inhabitants).

== Name ==
According to popular belief, it was named after a Croatian princess who lived in this region. Organized a competition in wearing. Anyone who thinks he deserves his hand and princesses need to take it back to the top of the "Notes Čuke" when it came to the peasants in which the princess was in love but he went to the hill pidnožiju died. And she said, "at this point the name shall be Biljeg" (Биљег) [Ruth Translation]

== Demographics ==
In the village of Biljeg there are 361 adult residents living and the average age is 44.6 years (44.1 for men and 45.2 for women). The village has 154 households, and the average number of occupants per household is 3.42. This village is mainly inhabited by Serbs (according to the census of 2002).
