= Arbanasce =

Village in Nisava, Serbia

Arbanasce Арбанасце
- Village
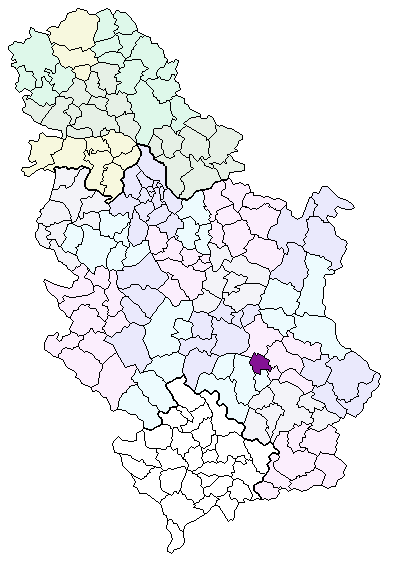
- Location of Merošina municipality in Serbia

- Location within Serbia
- Country: Serbia
- District: Nišava
- Municipality: Merošina

Population (2002)
  - Total: 568
- Time zone: UTC+1 (CET)
  - Summer (DST): UTC+2 (CEST)

Arbanasce, is a village in Serbia in the municipality Merošina in Nišava district . According to the census of 2002, there were 568 people (according to the census of 1991, there were 679 inhabitants).

== Name ==
The name of the village Arbanasce means Albanian.

== Demographics ==
This village is largely populated by Serbs (according to the census of 2002.) and in the last three censuses, there was a decline in population.
