= Baličevac =

Baličevac Баличевац
- Village
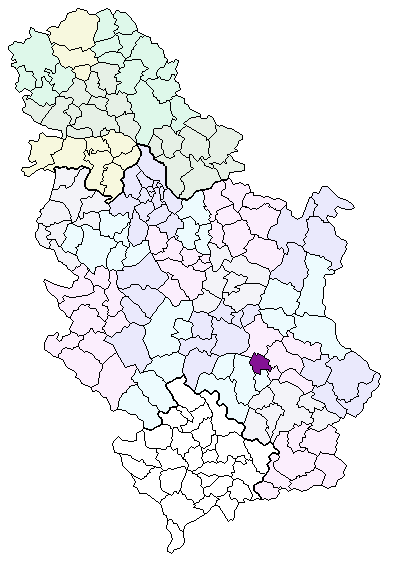
- Location of Merošina municipality in Serbia

- Location within Serbia
- Country: Serbia
- District: Nišava
- Municipality: Merošina

Population (2011)
  - Total: 1,144
- Time zone: UTC+1 (CET)
  - Summer (DST): UTC+2 (CEST)

Baličevac is a settlement in Serbia located in the municipality of Merošina, Nišava District. In the 2011 census, there were 1,144 inhabitants.

== History ==
In the Second World War, the Bulgarian Army set fire to the houses of partisans in the village, removing the villagers to a concentration camp.
