= Devča =

Devča Девча
- Village
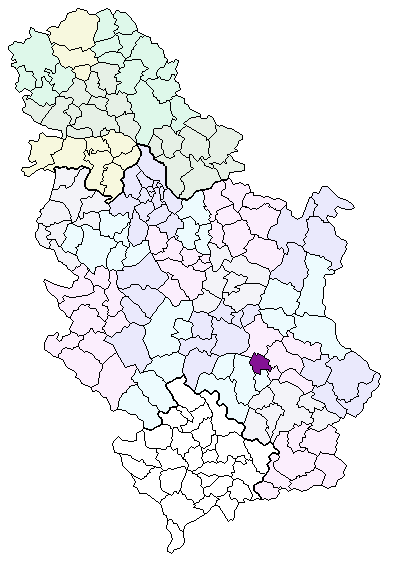
- Location of Merošina municipality in Serbia

- Location within Serbia
- Coordinates: 43°20′04″N 21°36′18″E
- Country: Serbia
- District: Nišava
- Municipality: Merošina

Population (2002)
  - Total: 492
- Time zone: UTC+1 (CET)
  - Summer (DST): UTC+2 (CEST)

Devča is a village situated in the Nišava district in Merošina municipality in Serbia. According to the 2002 census, there were 492 inhabitants (according to the 1991 census, there were 569 inhabitants). The population is completely dedicated to agriculture: fruit growing, vegetables, and to a lesser extent cattle breeding. The current situation in agriculture is very difficult due to the exhaustion of households' own funds, and also due to the lack of agricultural cooperatives. A larger number of younger residents are employed in the nearby towns of Niš and Prokuplje. In recent years, about 9 kilometers of road infrastructure has been renewed; a new primary school has been built, as well as a preschool institution.

== Demographics ==
There are 414 adults living in the settlement of Devča, and the average age of the population is 46.3 years: 44.4 for men and 48.4 for women. There are 166 households in the settlement, and the average number of members per household is 2.96.

This settlement is largely inhabited by Serbs (according to the census from 2002).

In the last three censuses, a decrease in the number of inhabitants was noticed.

Demographics
Year	Residents
1948	980
1953	1041
1961	1015
1971	861
1981	719
1991	569
2002	492

Ethnic composition according to the 2002 census‍
Ethnic Group	Population	Percentage
Serbs	479	97.35%
Yugoslavs	6	1.21%
Montenegrins	1	0.2%
Croats	1	0.2%
Unknown	5	1.01626%
