= Rovni Lake =

Water reservoir in Serbia

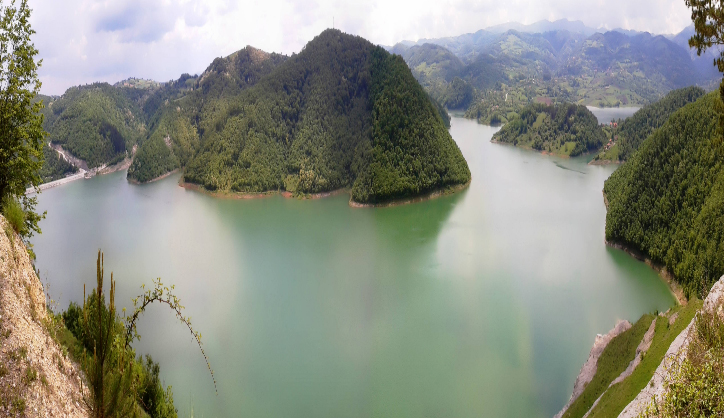

- Location within Serbia
- Location: Valjevo, western Serbia
- Coordinates: 44.2411°N 19.7547°E
- Lake type: Artificial
- Primary inflows: Jablanica and Sušica rivers
- Primary outflows: Jablanica river
- Catchment area: 10.4 km^{2} (4.0 sq mi)
- Basin countries: Serbia
- Surface area: 2.5 km^{2} (0.97 sq mi)
- Max. depth: 67 m (220 ft)
- Water volume: 51.5 million cubic metres (41,800 acre⋅ft)
- Surface elevation: 364 m (1,194 ft)
- Islands: 0

Rovni Lake (Serbian: Ровни језеро, Rovni јezero) is a water reservoir in western Serbia, created by damming the Jablanica river. It is located between the villages of Stubo and Rovni, 15 km (9.3 mi) from the city of Valjevo. The construction of the Stubo-Rovni dam was completed in September 2015. The lake is an integral part of the regional water management system "Rovni" providing water supply for the cities of Valjevo, Lazarevac, Lajkovac, Ub and Mionica.

== Characteristics ==
The dam is a rock-filled structure with water-resistant clay core. It is 74.5 m (244 ft) high, with a 450 m (1,480 ft) long crest. The total volume of the reservoir is 51,500,000 m^{3} (1.82×10^{9} cu ft). The works were executed by a joint venture formed by the companies "Hidrotehnika−Hidroenergetika" and "Energoprojekt Niskogradnja" plc, Belgrade, Serbia. Area of the lake is 2.5 km^{2} (0.97 sq mi).

Works began in the late 1980s, and by 2018, it was still not completed. It is estimated that the entire cost of the project amounted to €80 million. The conceived purpose of the project was multifunctional: waterworks supply, provision of the service water for the future thermal power station, protection from floods and maintenance of the biological minimum flow of the river Jablanica and, downstream, of the Kolubara. In 2018 a new project was announced, which envisions the irrigation of 6,000 ha (15,000 acres) of arable land in the Kolubara valley, downstream from Valjevo (municipalities of Valjevo, Lajkovac and Mionica).

The tests in March 2018 showed that the water is of high quality and can be used for the waterworks, but the infrastructure is not completed. The pipes connect Rovni with the water treatment facility Pećina near Valjevo. Pećina itself is connected with the Oštrikovac reservoir in the village of Slovac, where pipelines from Lajkovac, Lazarevac and Ub should connect. The arm which supplies Mionica will detach at the village of Divci. It is expected that the works will begin in 2019, and the set deadline is 2021.

== Controversy ==
Filling of the accumulation caused a controversy when the public learned that it would submerge the 15th-century Orthodox church of St. Michael in Tubravić, known as Valjevska Gračanica. Despite the explanations by Serbian Patriarch Irinej and manager of the Public Utility "Kolubara" that the Church signed the contract and exchanged the property back in 1991, and that a replacement church had been built elsewhere, several public protests were held. However, the filling proceeded as planned, and the church was finally submerged on 15 March 2016.

== 2014 floods ==
The lake is part of the Kolubara river watershed, as Jablanica is one of the headwaters which form the Kolubara, notorious for the flooding, especially of the town of Valjevo. Though it still wasn't completed, the reservoir was pivotal in protecting Valjevo during the 2014 Southeast Europe floods. The reservoir received the surplus of the water brought by the torrents and the often flooded Valjevo suffered no damage. This fact was used in public debates about the lake, concerning the flooding of the church. The prevention of flooding was often used as an example of a proper response in such a situation, amidst the mostly weak reaction of the other parts of the protective system and the government in general (see Paljuvi Lake).

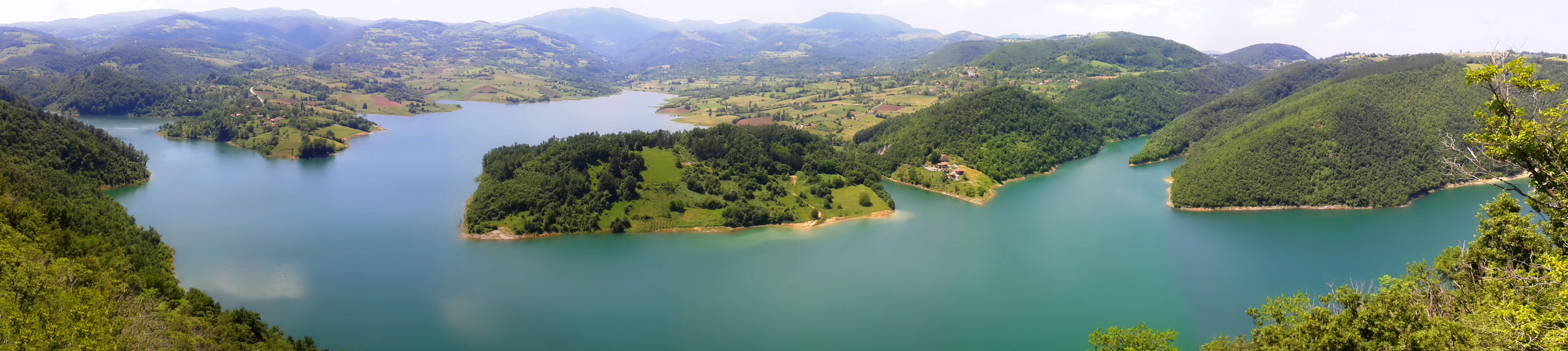
Panoramic view

== See also ==
- List of lakes in Serbia
