= Amajić =

Amajić Амајић
- Village (Selo)
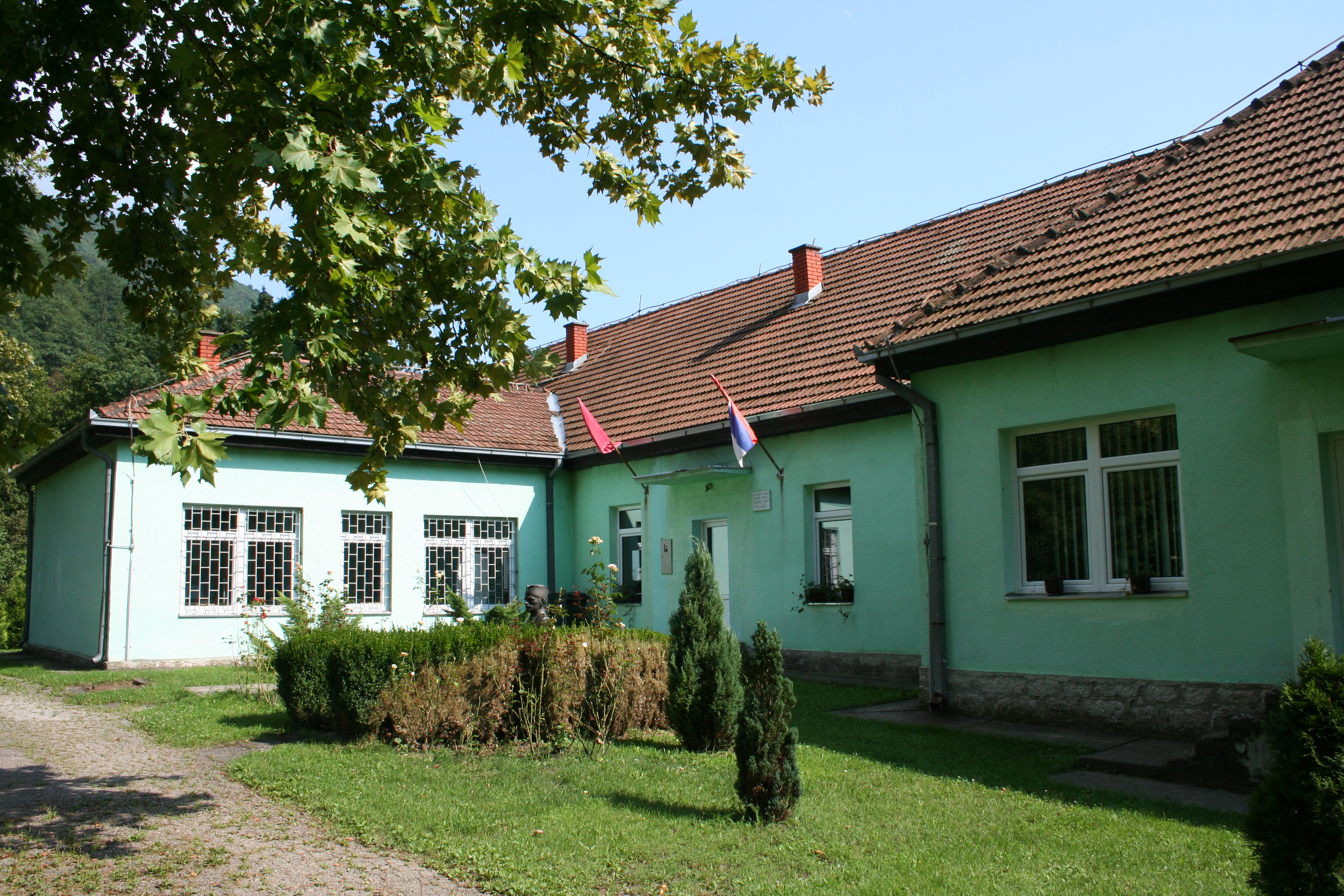

- Location within Serbia
- Coordinates: 44°19′9″N 19°8′57″E
- Country: Serbia
- District: Mačva
- Municipality: Mali Zvornik

Population (2011)
  - Total: 156
- Time zone: UTC+1 (CET)
  - Summer (DST): UTC+2 (CEST)

Amajić (Serbian Cyrillic: Амајић; pronounced [amajitɕ]) is a village in west-central Serbia. It is situated in the municipality of Mali Zvornik in the Mačva District of Central Serbia. The village is located on the banks of Zvornik Lake, a reservoir of the Drina River, on the international border between Serbia and Bosnia and Herzegovina. The population was 156 at the 2011 census.

== Demographics ==
As of the 2011 census, there were 156 people, 50 households, and 46 families in the village. There were 61 housing units, with 50 (82%) being continuously occupied. The average household size was 3.12 individuals. The average age was 42.5 years. The gender makeup was 51.2% male and 48.7% female.

As of the 2002 census, there were 186 people and 57 households in the village. The average household size was 3.25 individuals. The average age was 37.5 years. The gender makeup was 48.4% male and 51.6% female. The population was majority Serb, with 184 (99%) self-declaring as ethnic Serb. Of the residents, 122 (65.6%) had lived in the village since birth, 38 (20.4%) were born elsewhere in Mali Zvornik, 16 (8.6%) were born elsewhere in Central Serbia, 2 (1.1%) were born elsewhere in the Federal Republic of Yugoslavia, 7 (3.8%) were born in other states of former Yugoslavia, and 1 (0.5%) was born in other countries.

== Historical population ==
- 1948: 187
- 1953: 189
- 1961: 161
- 1971: 160
- 1981: 165
- 1991: 187
- 2002: 186

Historical population
Year	Pop.	±%
1948	187	—
1953	189	+1.1%
1961	161	−14.8%
1971	160	−0.6%
1981	165	+3.1%
1991	187	+13.3%
2002	186	−0.5%
2011	156	−16.1%

== See also ==
- List of places in Serbia
