= Očaga =

Lake in Serbia

Očaga Lake
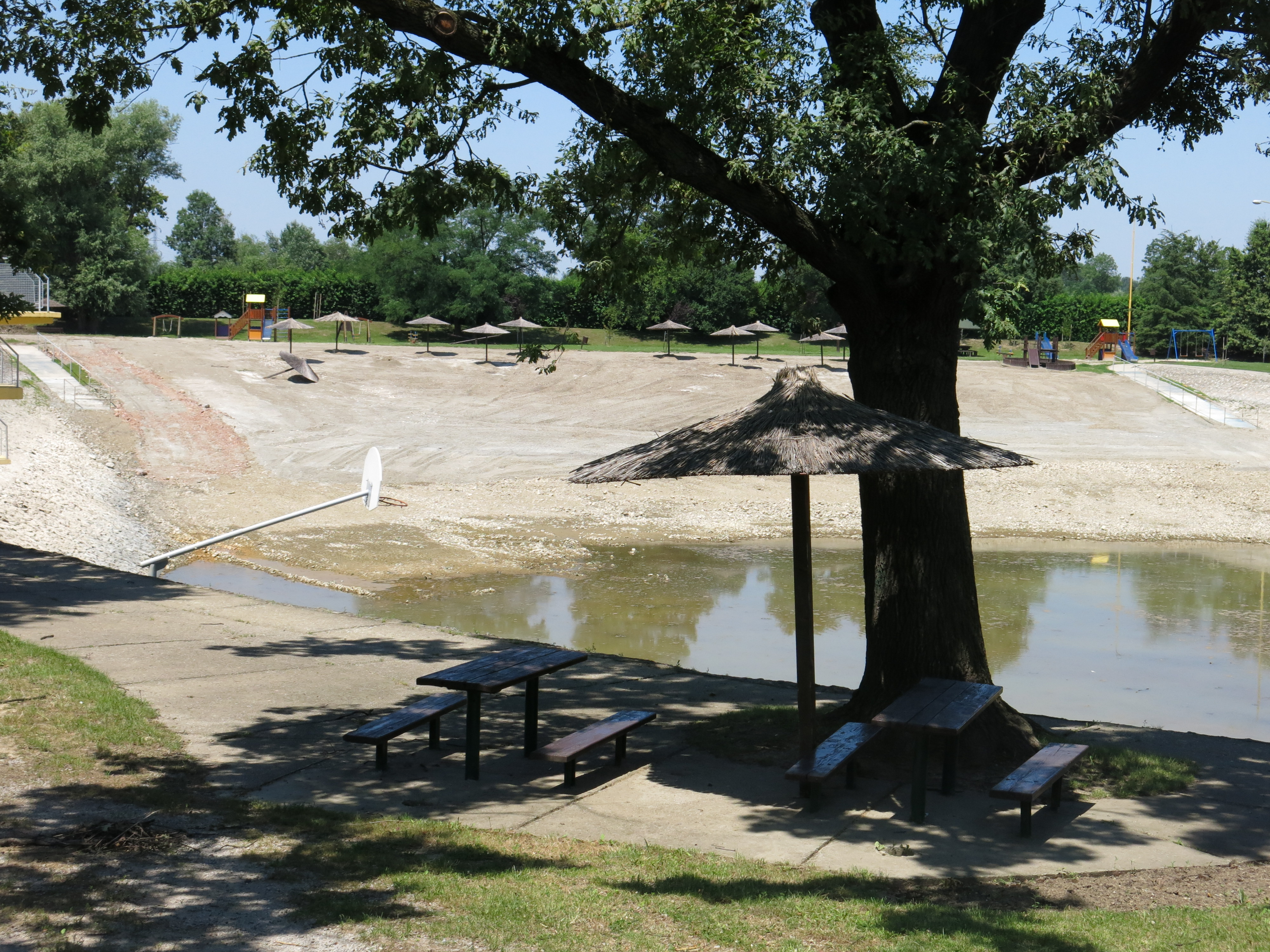
- The beach on Očaga Lake

- Location within Serbia
- Location: Lazarevac, Belgrade
- Coordinates: 44.3903052°N 20.2370655°E
- Type: reservoir
- Primary inflows: none
- Primary outflows: none
- Basin countries: Serbia
- Surface area: 0.12 km^{2} (0.046 sq mi)
- Max. depth: 6 m (20 ft)
- Surface elevation: 157 m (515 ft)
- Islands: none
- Settlements: Lazarevac

Očaga Lake (Serbian: Јеѕеро Очага) is an artificial lake in central Serbia. It is located on the territory of the City of Belgrade, in the municipality of Lazarevac.

== Location ==
Očaga Lake is located in the valley of the Lukavica river, south of the Očaga canal. It is situated on the territory of the village of Petka, a western suburb of Lazarevac, though it is closer to Šopić, the northern suburb. The lake is 60 km (37 mi) south-west from downtown Belgrade, on the Ibar Highway. There are actually two adjoining lakes with the same name, so for distinction, they are called Nova Očaga (New Očaga) and Stara Očaga (Old Očaga).

== New Očaga ==
New Očaga is what is usually considered as Očaga in colloquial language. The lake covers an area of 12 ha (30 acres), has a concrete bottom and is 6 m (20 ft) deep. It was constructed specifically as the swimming resort and it is supplied with water from the underground springs which is filtered and controlled on a daily basis, so the water is suitable for swimming and water sports. The lake has a diving boards, water slide a pool and lifeguards and divers present. Entire lake is encircled with the pedestrian path and a green ring, including high oak trees. One part of the shore is turned into the sandy beach with parasols made only from natural materials. The capacity of the lake is 6,000 visitors daily. The beach is decorated with the flower gardens and has a courts for futsal and beach volleyball. The lake also has an artificial water-jet fountain. As the lake is right next to the highway, with a large parking, restaurant, plateau and proper lighting, it is often a location of the festivals, concerts and workshops, and is a major camping area in the region. That makes if the center of the cultural life in Lazarevac. The lake is populated with common carp, grass carp and Prussian carp, but the fish is in the lake only to maintain the balance of the lake's ecosystem and the fishing is strictly forbidden.

== Old Očaga ==
Old Očaga is immediately north of New Očaga. It is elongated, 800 m (2,600 ft) long and 40 m (130 ft) and basically is a canal. The lake's shore was cleaned from the undergrowth and the lake was cleaned from the mud and tree branches. It has a very clean water and is populated with fish, mostly Prussian carp, common bream and common roach. Unlike New Očaga, fishing is allowed, but with a mandatory permit. Storks and herons live around the lake.

== See also ==
- List of lakes in Serbia
