= Vračev Gaj =

Vračev Gaj Врачев Гај
- Village (Selo)
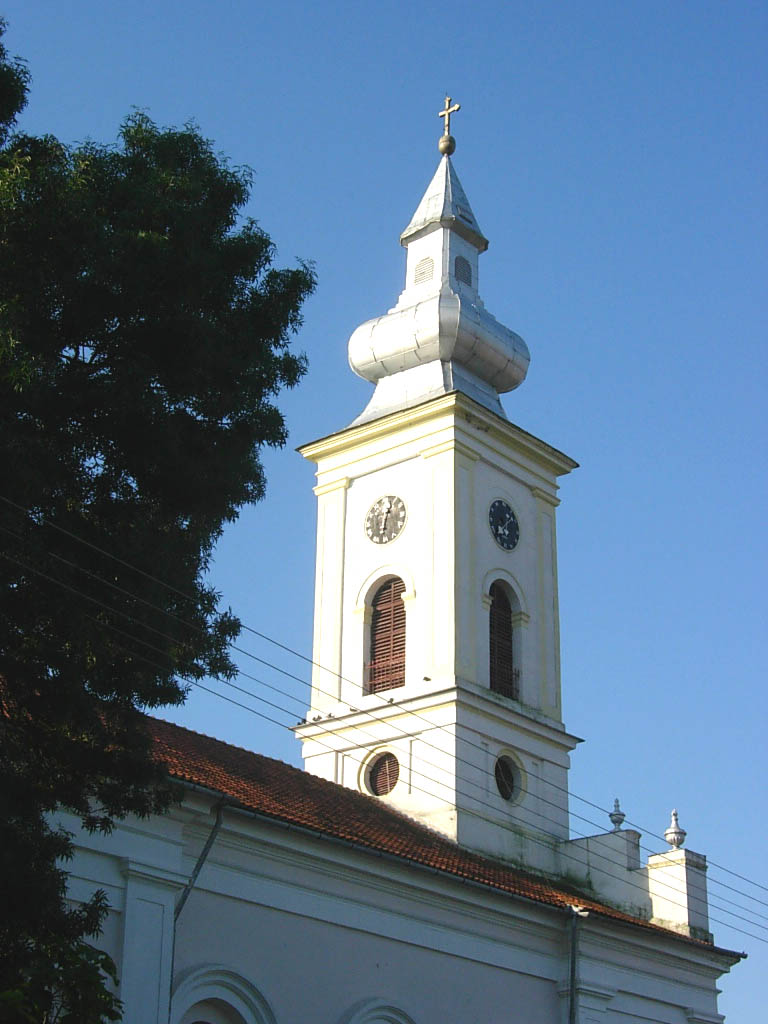
- The Orthodox Church

- Location of Vračev Gaj within Serbia Vračev Gaj (Serbia) Vračev Gaj (Europe)
- Coordinates: 44°52′16″N 21°21′28″E
- Country: Serbia
- Province: Vojvodina
- District: South Banat
- Municipality: Bela Crkva
- Elevation: 69 m (226 ft)

Population (2002)
  - Vračev Gaj: 1,568
- Time zone: UTC+1 (CET)
  - Summer (DST): UTC+2 (CEST)
- Postal code: 26348
- Area code: +381(0)13
- Car plates: VŠ

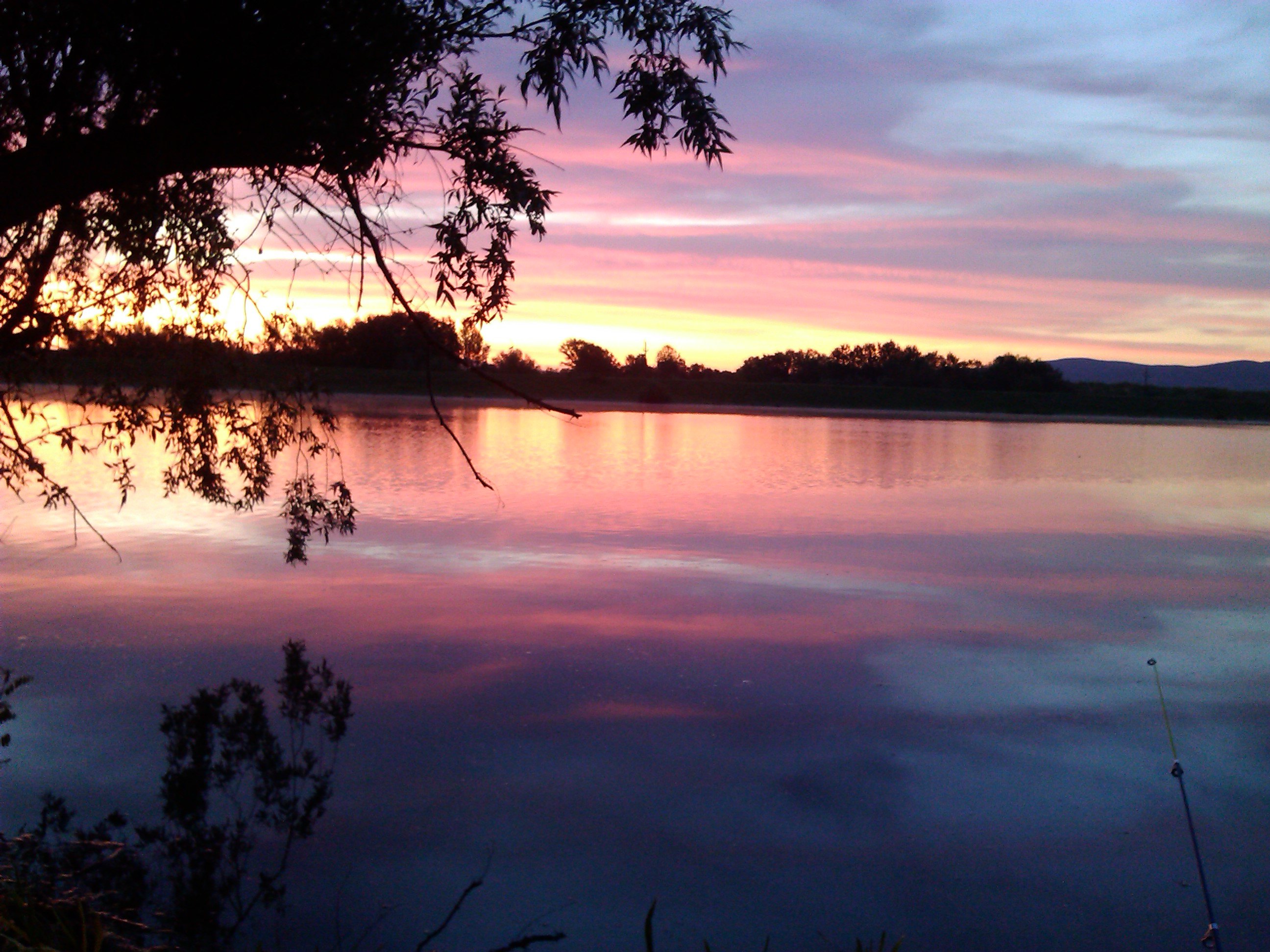
Danube-Tisa-Danube Canal at village Vračev Gaj, near the "Devil`s bridge".

Vračev Gaj (Serbian Cyrillic: Врачев Гај) is a village in Serbia. It is situated in the Bela Crkva municipality, in the South Banat District, Vojvodina province. The village has a Serb ethnic majority (94.57%) and a population of 1,568 (2002 census).

== Name ==
In Serbian, the village is known as Vračev Gaj (Врачев Гај), in Hungarian as Varázsliget, and in Croatian as Vračev Gaj.

== Historical population ==
- 1961: 2,250
- 1971: 2,145
- 1981: 2,040
- 1991: 1,870
- 2002: 1,568

== See also ==
- Bela Crkva lakes
- List of places in Serbia
- List of cities, towns and villages in Vojvodina
