= Sremčica =

Sremčica Сремчица
- Suburban settlement
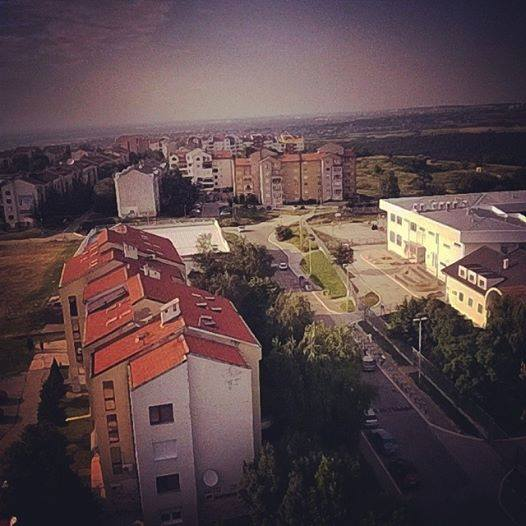
- Panorama of inner Sremčica

- Location within Serbia
- Coordinates: 44°40′22″N 20°23′21″E
- Country: Serbia
- City: Belgrade
- Municipality: Čukarica

Area
  - Total: 22.63 km^{2} (8.74 sq mi)
- Elevation: 191 m (627 ft)

Population (2011)
  - Total: 21,001
  - Density: 928.0/km^{2} (2,404/sq mi)
- Time zone: UTC+1 (CET)
  - Summer (DST): UTC+2 (CEST)
- Postal codes: 11253; 11255
- Area code: +381(0)11
- Car plates: BG
- Website: sremcica.org.rs

Sremčica (Serbian Cyrillic: Сремчица) is a suburban settlement within the municipality of Čukarica in the city of Belgrade, Serbia.

== Location ==
Sremčica is located south of Belgrade and begins some 2 km south of the southernmost part of the neighborhood of Železnik (though centers of these two settlements are 6-7 kilometers apart). It is a typical road settlement stretched along the central Beogradska street, with many side streets simply being named Beogradska street part 1, 2, etc., but most of them got their own, separate names in 2004–2007. The northern section of the neighborhood makes a separate local community (mesna zajednica), sub-municipal administrative unit, named Gorica but is popularly called Naselje (Serbian for "settlement") by the local population, which numbered 5,358 in 2002. Southern part is organized as a local community with the same name as the entire settlement, Sremčica. Both local communities were later merged into one.

== Demographics ==
Historical population
Year	Pop.	±% p.a.
1921	1,890	—
1948	2,076	+0.35%
1953	2,133	+0.54%
1961	2,185	+0.30%
1971	2,445	+1.13%
1981	13,193	+18.36%
1991	15,730	+1.77%
2002	18,450	+1.46%
2011	21,001	+1.45%

According to the 2011 census results, Sremčica has 21,001 inhabitants. Predominantly a rural settlement, it is one of the fastest growing suburbs of Belgrade since the 1970s. However, its accelerated growth without any planned construction, is not followed by the equal growth of infrastructure, so most parts of Sremčica have some major communal problems (water, sewage, traffic). Despite having population of almost 21,000 inhabitants, only two bus lines (511 and 512) connects it to 20 km away Belgrade.

== Geography ==
Terrain around the settlement is partially made of limestone (karstic micro-region, called Belgrade merokras). One of the best known features in Sremčica is a small pond, Rakina bara, meaning "Raka's pond". It is a small natural lake with an area of 3 ha (7.4 acres), formed in the limestone pit, the only karst lake on the territory of the city of Belgrade. It is embedded into the mass wasting area and, typically for the karst lakes, has a sinkhole. Turned into a fish pond and projected as the future recreational area, as the settlement grew, population from the neighboring slopes turned their sewage pipes into the pond which is today covered with reed, turned into a dump and without any fish at all as it almost dried out. The majority of the water is replenished by a local creek. By 2023, the lake was partially restored.

Near Sremčica is also a karstic cave, Turski Točak ("Turkish wheel"). There are two additional caves to the west, near Pećani, called Donja Pećina and Gornja Pećina ("upper cave" and "lower cave").
