= Rakina Bara =

Lake in Serbia

- Ракина Бара (Serbian)
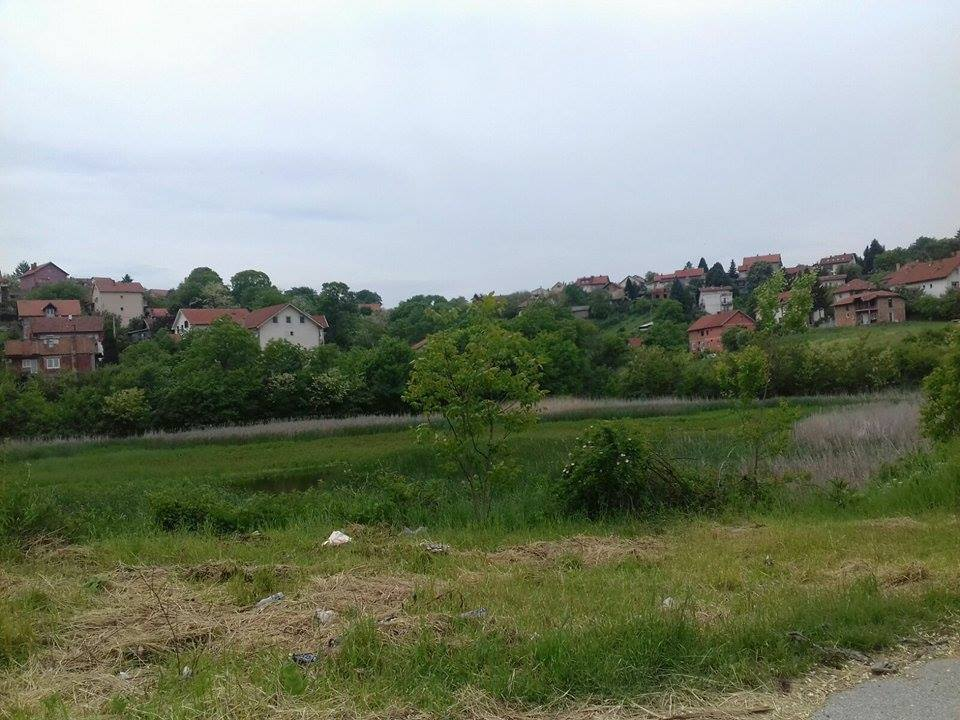
- Rakina Bara covered with overgrowth

- Location within Serbia
- Coordinates: 44.680734°N 20.393034°E
- Primary inflows: nameless creek
- Primary outflows: none
- Basin countries: Serbia
- Max. length: 170 m (560 ft)
- Max. width: 110 m (360 ft)
- Surface area: 1.6 ha (4.0 acres)
- Max. depth: 1.5 m (4 ft 11 in)
- Surface elevation: 180 m (590 ft)
- Islands: none
- Settlements: Sremčica

Rakina Bara (Serbian Cyrillic: Ракина Бара) is a lake in Sremčica, a suburb of Belgrade, Serbia. It is located in the municipality of Čukarica.

== Location ==
The lake is located 20 km (12 mi) south of downtown Belgrade. It is situated in the northeast section of Sremčica, east of the central thoroughfare, the Beogradska Street, just south of the Sremčica Cemetery and the neighborhood of Gorica.

== Geography ==
Rakina Bara is situated in the limestone pit, in the karstic micro-region called Belgrade merokras. It is embedded into the mass wasting area and, typically for the karst lakes, has a sinkhole. It is the largest natural lake in the Šumadija section of Belgrade and the only karst lake in the city territory. Rakina bara is one of six (formerly 15) karst lakes in the entire Šumadija region. The lake is oval-shaped, 170 m (560 ft) long, 110 m (360 ft) wide and 1 m (3 ft 3 in) deep. It is situated at an altitude of 180 m (590 ft), and covers an area of 1.6 ha (4.0 acres).

However, when geographer Jovan Cvijić visited the pond, the lake was smaller in area, 124 by 112 m (407 by 367 ft), but was much deeper, up to 8 metres (26 ft). Until the 1950s the water was so clear, that "every pebble on the bottom could be seen". Cvijić also recorded springs on the south side of the lake.

Rakina Bara receives water from two springs and atmospheric precipitation. Before the lake dried out, the major inflow was 170 metres (560 ft) long and brought 20 to 70 L/min (4.4 to 15.4 imp gal/min; 5.3 to 18.5 US gal/min). It has no outflows.

The name of the lake means "Raka's Pond" in Serbian (Raka is a male nickname). According to the local folklore, Raka was a denizen who was digging sand and transporting water out of the pond, but one day he accidentally fell in the water and drowned.

== Wildlife ==
=== Plants ===
As the lake shrank, it was gradually buried under the overgrowth, mostly made of the reed-like plants.

=== Animals ===
Lake used to be abundant in fish as in the 1950s it was turned into a fish pond. Carps up to 5 kg (11 lb) were fished with nets and until the early 2000s fishing competitions were organized. Today almost all of the fish in the lake died out and an occasional snake, duck or grebe can be spotted. Formerly, 17 species of birds nested in the lake's vicinity.

== Human interaction ==
Rakina Bara was originally deeper and the water was clear all the way to the bottom. At the location where the creek flew into the lake, local farmers watered their cattle. As the shore was sandy and the mud was only present at the deepest, central part of the lakebed, it was used for swimming. It was one of the earliest nudist locations in Serbia, dating back to the beginning of the 20th century. Later, it became a popular lover's lane for the city couples.

As the water was clear, local population used it for swimming, to water cattle, to wash horses and to fish carps. They were also using the water for watering the crops, to use it in gas-operating threshing machines, while in the winter when the pond would froze, they cut ice for domestic use, while the children were skating over the surface. Professor Sava Stekić, the chronicler of Sremčica wrote that "newcomers who try fish from the Rakina Bara, will never leave the village again". In the 1950s it was populated with several species of fish, turning it into the fish pond. Plans were made to arrange the shores, build the restaurants and turn it into the tourist center and a recreational area, but the local authorities were not interested, so the plans were abandoned.

Sremčica experienced a massive population growth since the 1970s and the population grew from 2,445 in 1971 to 13,193 in 1981 and 21,001 in 2011. As the settlement grew, it engulfed the lake and the surrounding area was urbanized. Dying of the pond began at the turn of the 21st century. The lake was reduced in size as the local population, in order to get more land, illegally dug outflow canals to drain the water and even threw mercury into the sinkhole to erode the land and make the sinkhole wider in order to drain water more quickly. Households from the neighboring slopes turned their sewage pipes into Rakina Bara emptying their cesspits in the pond. The pond was also turned into a dump, with garbage of all kinds being dumped in it. As the lake reduced in size, the spring which brings the majority of water into it, for the most part of the year stopped reaching the lake as it is close to the sinkhole so it flows directly into the ground through it, practically turning the pond into a large cesspool. As the water drains through the earth, it widens the holes in it producing the cracks in the ground already prone to the mass wasting. Basically digging the land under the lake, it might set mass wasting in motion which would bury the pond completely. In the 2010s, Rakina Bara was on the brink of completely dying out.

== Revitalization ==
Shores of the pond were cleaned to some extent in 2008. At that time, the study on saving the pond was done. Proposed short term interventions included cleaning of the garbage from the lake and the surrounding area, emptying and closing of the cesspits and ban on building on the slopes above the pond. Further, long-term measures should include the chemical and bacteriological analysis of the water, creation of the "wet field" which would naturally filter the water, channeling of the creek to reach the pond again and the restoration of the sinkhole. Another study from 2012 proposed that the pond should be saved with the construction of the sewage system and by placing Rakina bara under protection. However, the pond and the surroundings are too polluted, thus not fulfilling the basic conditions for protection. As for the other proposals, none of them turned into projects, due to either lack of funds (municipality of Čukarica) or the typical bureaucratic "it is not my jurisdiction" attitude (city, communal companies, nature protection agencies).

In time, the water almost completely disappeared from the lake and the mass wasting became active. In November 2019, eco-activists cleaned the creek, conducting it again into the lake. The creek's route was dredged with an excavator, removing large quantities of clay, garbage and sludge and growths of reed and wild blackberry. The creek's inflow into the lake increased from an average 10 to 50 L/min (2.2 to 11.0 imp gal/min; 2.6 to 13.2 US gal/min), so after one month the water level in the lake reached midcalf. During the 2019/2020 winter, it even froze. However, as the bottom of the lake was neither cleaned nor surveyed, the creek was again rerouted into the sinkhole. The bottom will be surveyed for possible sinkholes and if it will be needed to remove the sludge.

By the early 2020, the sewage system was built for the surrounding houses, so wastewater stopped flowing into the creek and the lake. Further cleaning ensued in February 2020. There were suggestions of making a clay plug to block the sinkhole in the future. However, further steps from the 2007 study (geodetic surveys, chemical analyses of the soil, access road), are outside of the eco-activists' hands and cooperation from the local administration and communal services is needed.

The creek was almost completely cleaned from sludge by January 2021 and the water level in the lake reached 0.5 m (1 ft 8 in), meaning that there are no holes in the lakebed to drain the water. The inflow of water was stabilized at 70 m^{3}/d (29 cu ft/ks). The cleaned inflow creek is 275 m (902 ft) long, and instead of conducting it into the pipes, the special foil will be placed in its bed to prevent the dissipation of the water and to preserve the creeks natural appearance. Almost 1.5 m (4 ft 11 in) thick sludge deposits from the bottom of the lakebed were also removed. At this point, the ecologists couldn't locate the second water source which feeds the lake, as it got buried in time. There are ideas to pour gravel on the bottom of the lake, for the natural filtration of the water.

By the mid-2021, the depth at the center of the lake reached 1.5 m (4 ft 11 in), so the lake was restocked. Some birds returned, too. It was possible to use small boats and to swim. Some 5,000 m^{3} (180,000 cu ft) of earth was used to create the 510 m (1,670 ft) long pathway around the lake. Annual "Bara Fest" was founded in 2021. In the summer of 2022, the central depth reached 1.7 m (5 ft 7 in). The area of the other water well, Česmica, was also cleaned. Ducks, storks and herons returned to the lake. The lake has not been restocked systematically, instead residents were bringing various species of fishes, so the lake was populated with pike, common carp, Prussian carp and common chub. The fished specimen must be returned into the lake.
