= Paljuvi =

- Village (Selo)
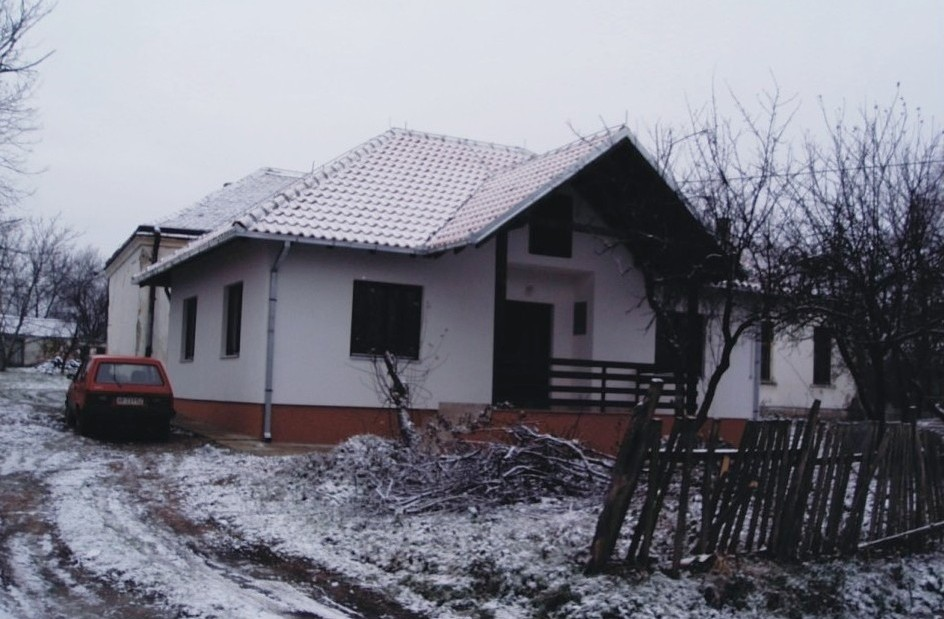

- Location within Serbia
- Coordinates: 44°26′N 20°08′E
- Country: Serbia
- District: Kolubara District
- Municipality: Ub

Area
  - Total: 17.10 km^{2} (6.60 sq mi)
- Elevation: 120 m (390 ft)

Population (2011)
  - Total: 691
  - Density: 40.4/km^{2} (105/sq mi)
- Time zone: UTC+1 (CET)
  - Summer (DST): UTC+2 (CEST)

Paljuvi is a village in the municipality of Ub, Serbia. According to the 2011 census, the village has a population of 691 people.

== Lake Paljuvi ==
Lake Paljuvi, or Paljuvi-Viš Reservoir, was built in 1988 when the Kladnica river was dammed. Within the Kolubara river watershed, it was created specifically for the protection of the open-pit mine Zapadno Polje, part of the vast Kolubara mines ("RB Kolubara") as the Kolubara is a notoriously flooding-prone river, and also to protect the nearby thermal power station. Projected to receive the surplus water, the lake is connected to the small Vraničina river by a drainage tunnel. The reservoir was mostly kept almost empty, so that it would be ready to receive the water and in the next 25 years there was never an overspill of the water over the dam, as the drainage tunnel was always operational. In 2008, RB Kolubara, which administered the reservoir handed over the care over it to the local fishing association from Valjevo, "Eko Ribarstvo". In order to enhance the fish production, they filled the reservoir, removed some of the equipment while the rest rusted in time, closed the sluice gates and welded the drainage hatchets.

Unlike the Rovni Lake, system at the Lake Paljuvi failed completely during the catastrophic 2014 Southeast Europe floods. State water directory ordered emptying of the lake only on 12 May, two days before the fatal floods occurred. When the torrent hit the full reservoir on 14 May it began to overspill and the water directly rushed into the Kolubara and flooded the mines. At that point, draining the water through the tunnel was of no help. "Eko Ribarstvo" claimed that the lake was not full and that their job was to take care of the fish, while the lake was in care of RB Kolubara, adding that they needed 20 days to empty the lake but instead they were told to empty it only 2 days before and that "no one could expect so much rain in 7 days". Still, according to the official specifications, emptying of the lake lasts from 16 to 21 days depending on the water level, so it means that it was almost full. Experts added that there are, or should be, plans with the timetable when the reservoirs are to be filled and emptied, and that when there is a rainy season, levels should be minimal so there will be no surprise when the torrents form. RB Kolubara admitted that parts of its own corporation should operate the lake, but that there is no proper paperwork, as there are still some unsolved property ownership issues. If empty and properly maintained, Paljuvi Lake should be able to prevent flooding even during the millennial floods.
