= Bela Crkva lakes =

- Белоцркванска језера (Serbian)
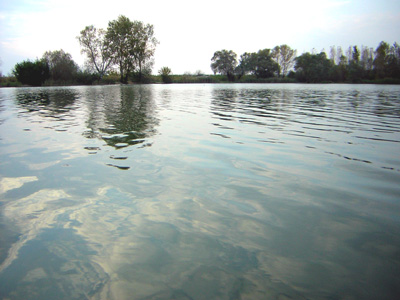
- Vračev Gaj Lake, 2007

- Location within Vojvodina Location within Serbia
- Interactive map of Bela Crkva lakes
- Map of Bela Crkva lakes
- Location: Bela Crkva, Banat, Vojvodina
- Coordinates: 44.894644°N 21.408226°E
- Type: Artificial lakes
- Basin countries: Serbia
- Built: 1904-Present
- Surface area: 150 hectares (370 acres)
- Sections/sub-basins: Glavno jezero; Vračevgajsko jezero; Šljunkara; Šaransko jezero; Novo jezero; Malo jezero

Bela Crkva lakes (Serbian: Белоцркванска језера, romanized: Belocrkvanska jezera) is a group of six larger and several smaller artificial lakes near the town of Bela Crkva, in the southern Banat region in the Serbian province of Vojvodina. Deep pits emerged as a result of gravel exploitation, and were subsequently filled by aquifers and rainfall. With clean and unpolluted water suitable for bathing, they are a popular travel destination.

== Lakes ==
The lakes occupy the total area of 150 hectares (370 acres). Larger ones include:

- The Main lake (Glavno jezero) or the City lake (Gradsko jezero) is situated closest to the town centre. It is the best equipped, and has several pebbly beaches, restaurants and paved paths.
- Vračev Gaj lake (Vračevgajsko jezero) lies further down the road towards the village of Vračev Gaj. It has a camp site with 200 camping spots, some bungalows and a pebbly beach.
- Gravel pit (Šljunkara) is the largest lake, with a large beach and an island.
- Carp lake (Šaransko jezero) has a crystal clear water, is not developed for swimming and is a good destination for fishing.
- New lake (Novo jezero) is the farthest from the town.
- Small lake (Malo jezero)

== History ==
Exploitation of gravel in the area started in 1904. First, it was dug out manually and transported by horse carts, and then the process was taken over by excavators and railway transport. The gravel was used for roads and river embankments. Industrial excavation began c.1948 and since then the pits were mostly created. The gravel is still excavated only on the New lake.

== Tourism ==
During summer, there are up to 5,000 visitors on the lakes' shores. Many cultural, entertainment and sports festivities are being held throughout the season. They include "Carneval of the flowers" and "Bela Crkva's apple picking".

The lakes are especially popular among fishermen. In 1957, a wels catfish, which was 2.5 m (8 ft 2 in) long and weighted 70 kg (150 lb) was caught in the Main lake. In 1988 a story another massive catfish in the lake was published for the first time. It was named "Besi", an acronym of [Be]la Crkva and Ne[si], Serbian rendering of the name Nessie, the Loch Ness Monster. Ever since, a yearly tournament titled "Hunt on Besi" is held. It is estimated that by 2008, Besi has grown to 150 kg (330 lb). Catfishes of 30 kg (66 lb) are commonly caught in the lakes.
