= Stubo (Valjevo) =

Coordinates: 44.2314°N 19.7667°E

- Village (Selo)
- Interactive map of Stubo
- Country: Serbia
- District: Kolubara District
- Municipality: Valjevo

Population (2002)
  - Total: 282
- Time zone: UTC+1 (CET)
  - Summer (DST): UTC+2 (CEST)

Stubo is a village in the municipality of Valjevo, Serbia. According to the 2002 census, the village has a population of 282 people.

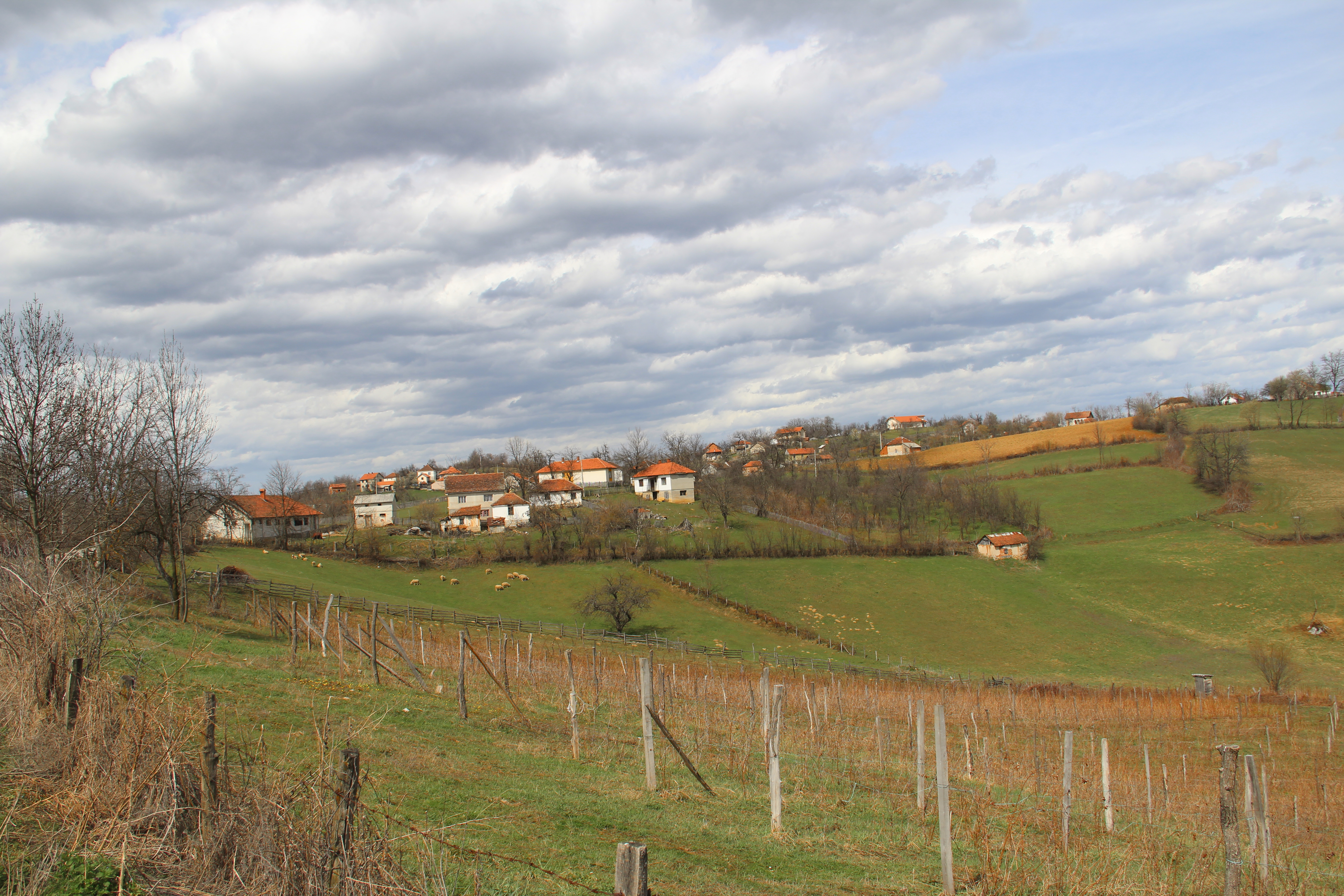
Stubo - panorama

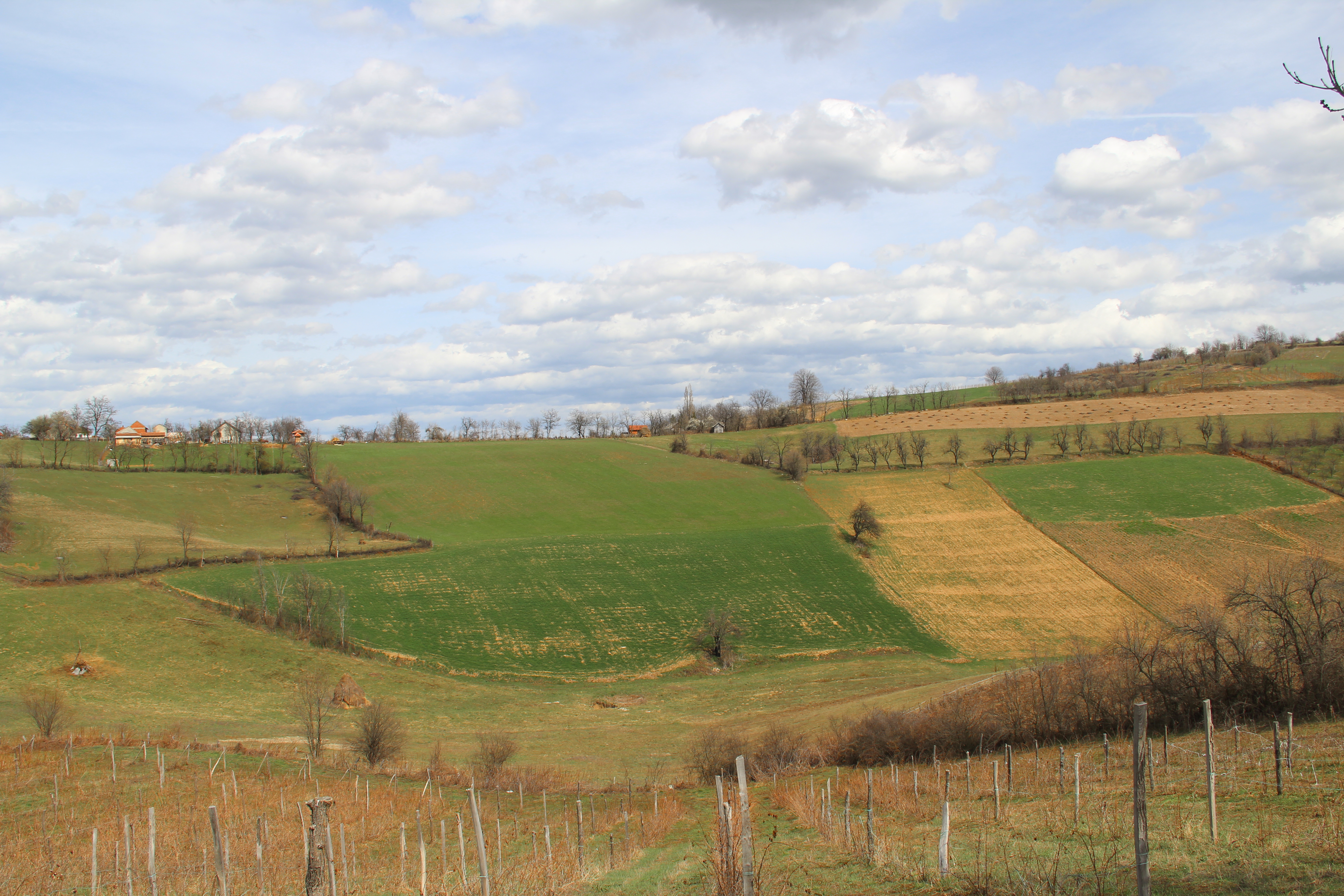
Stubo - panorama

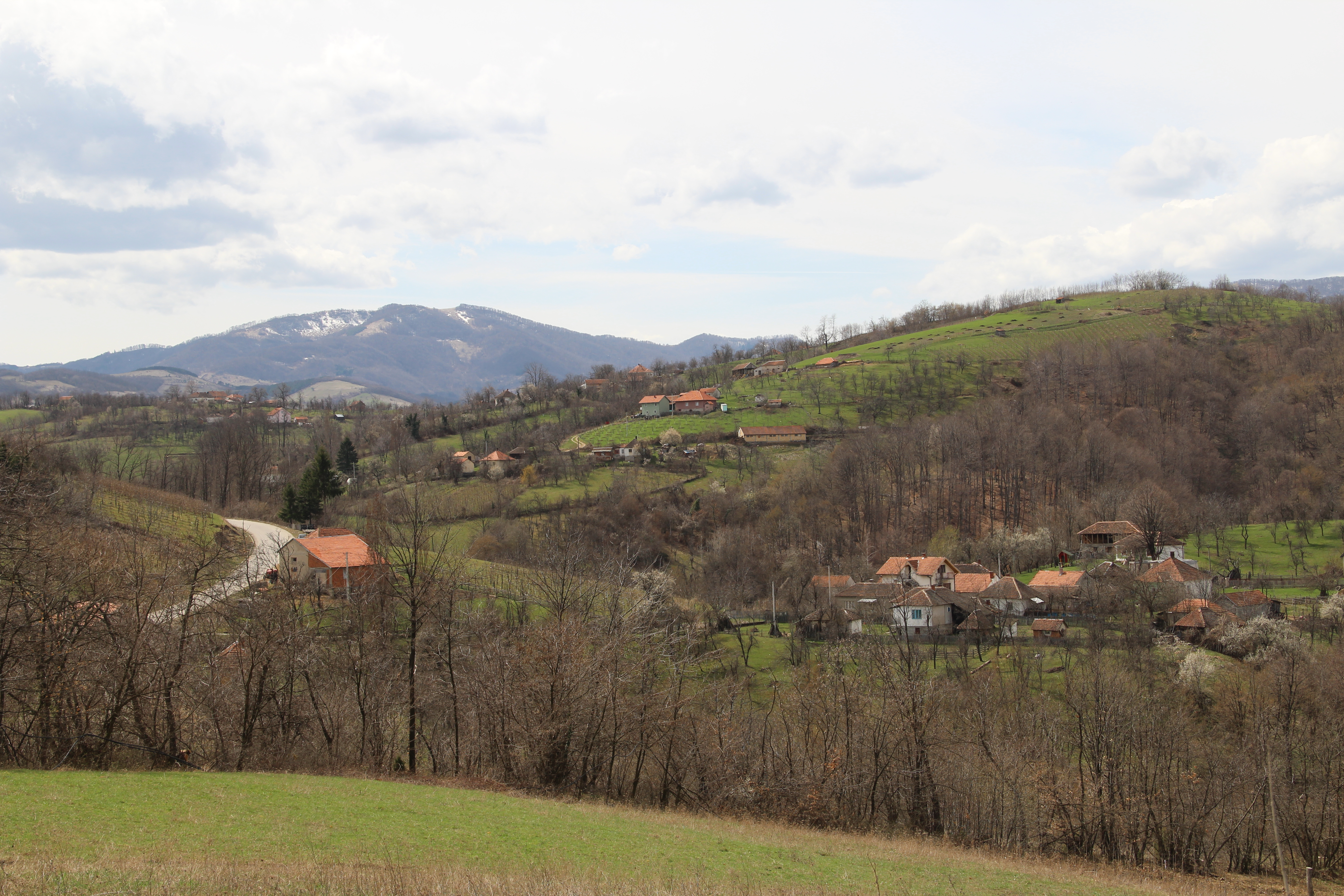
Stubo - panorama

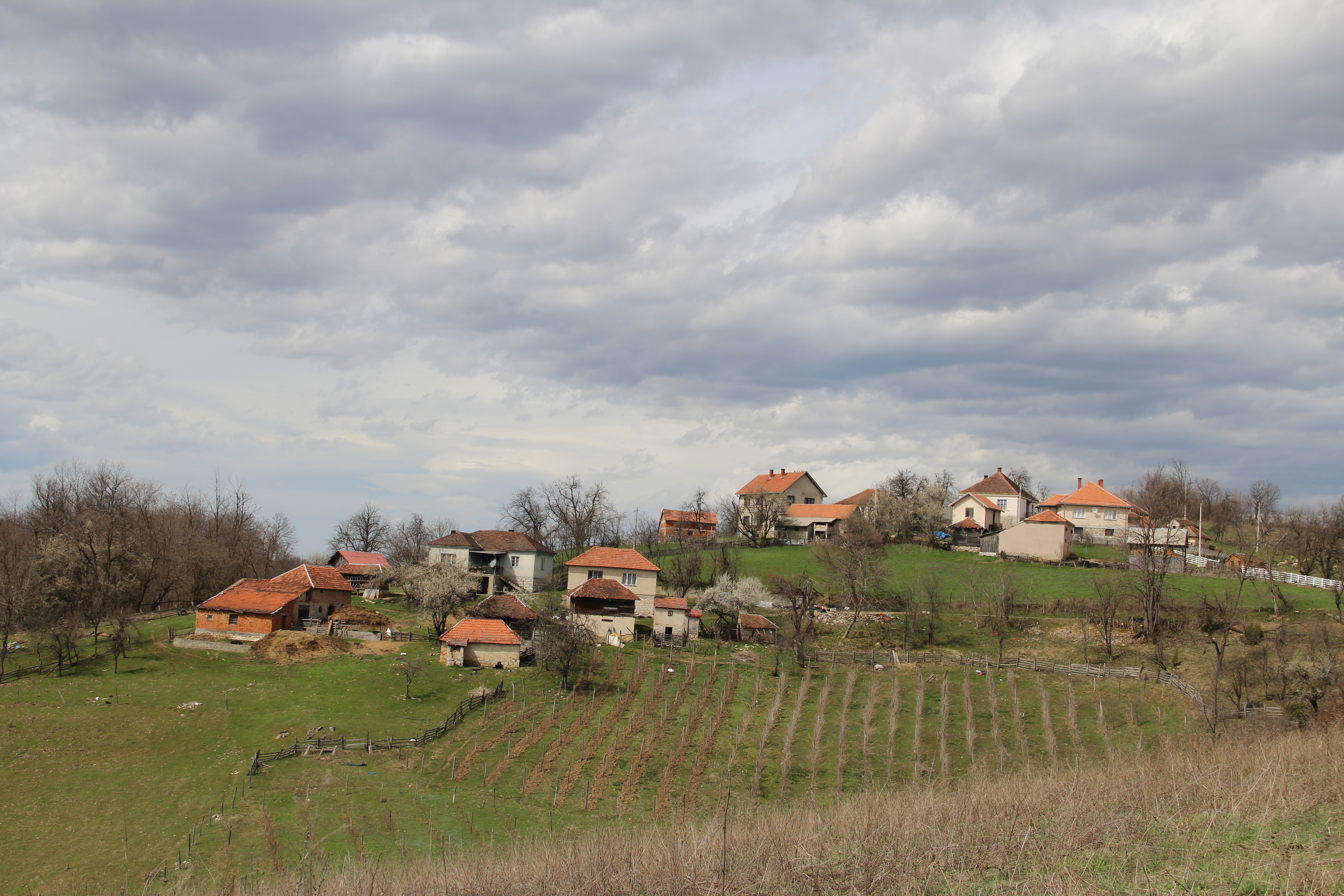
Stubo - panorama

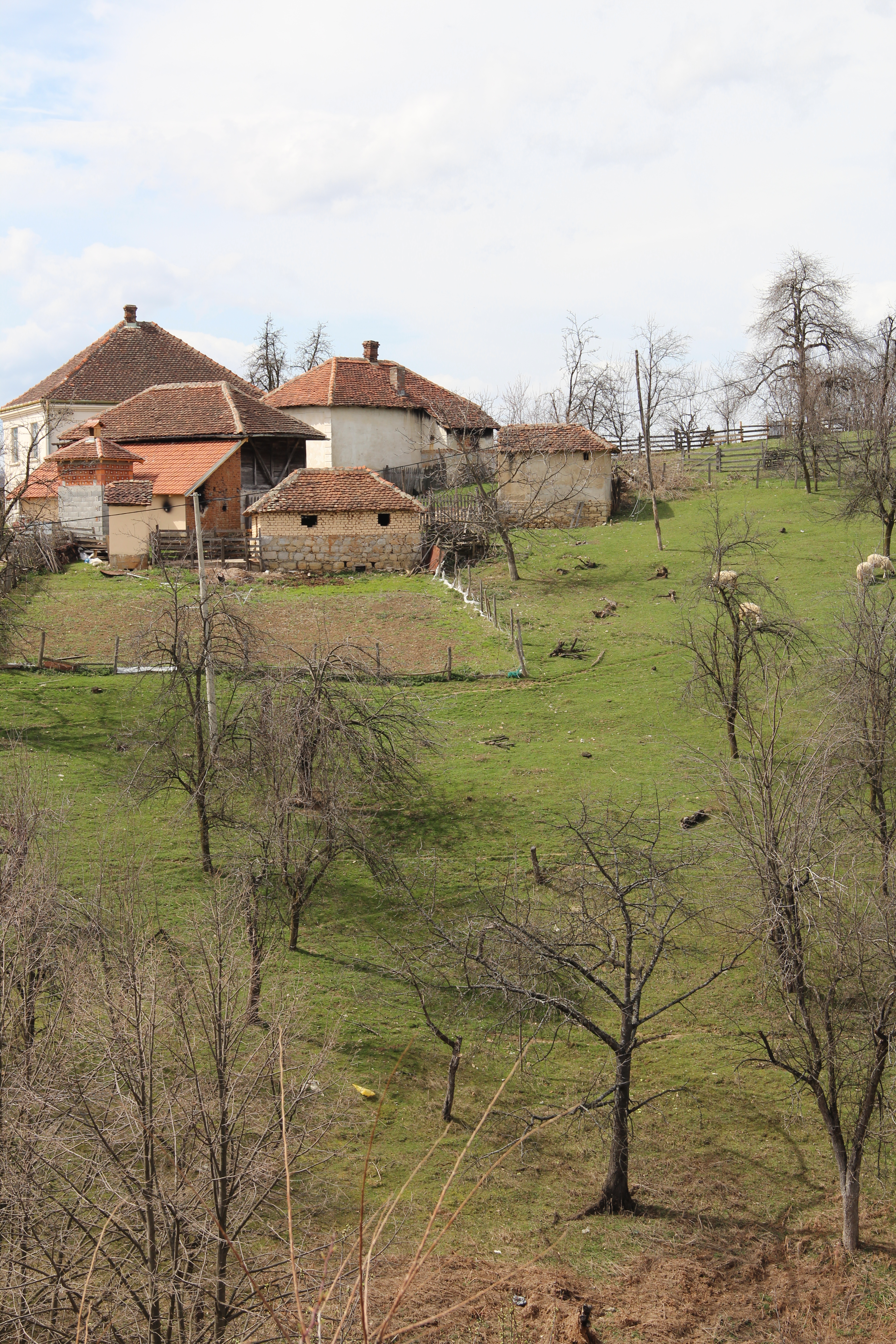
Stubo - panorama

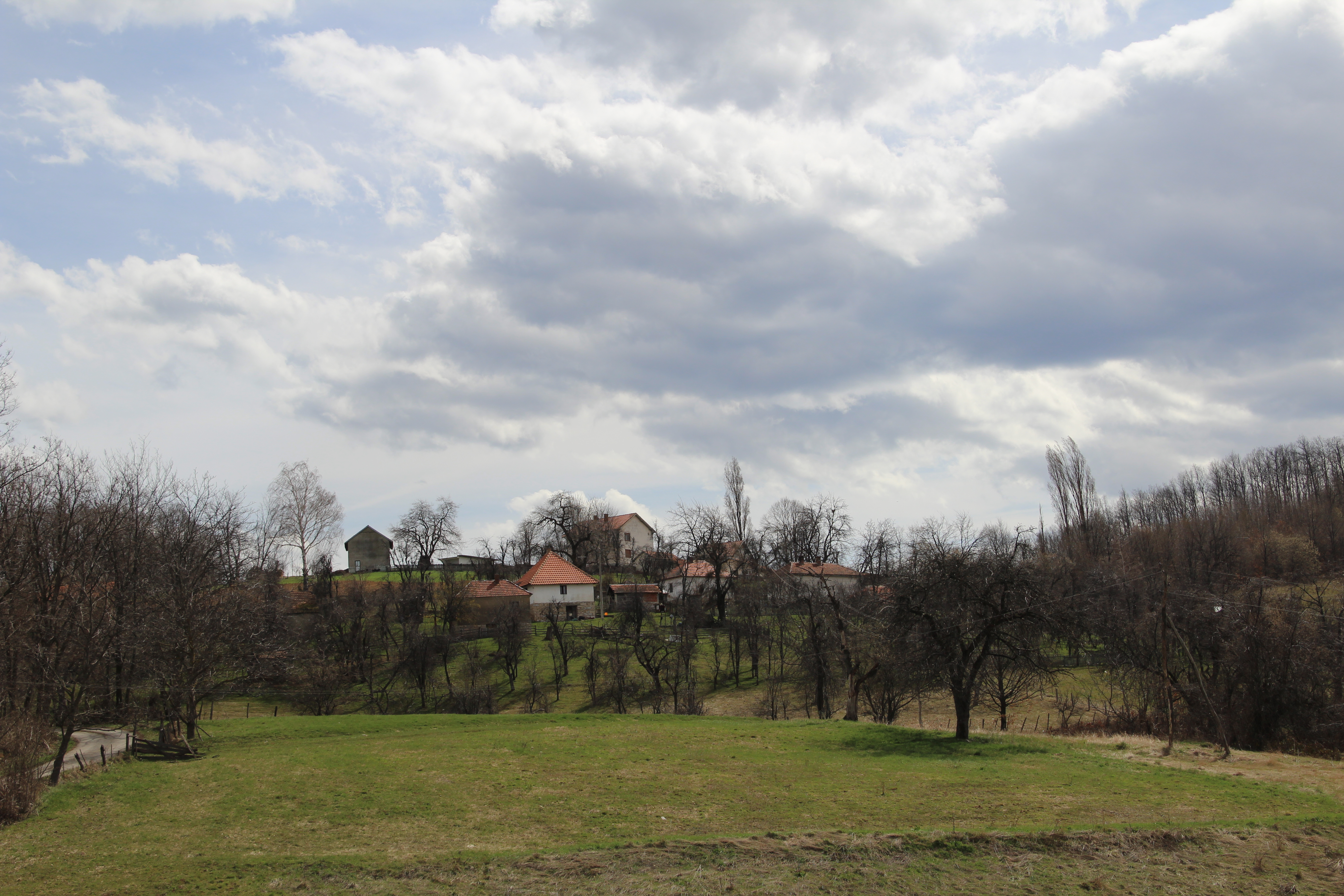
Stubo - panorama

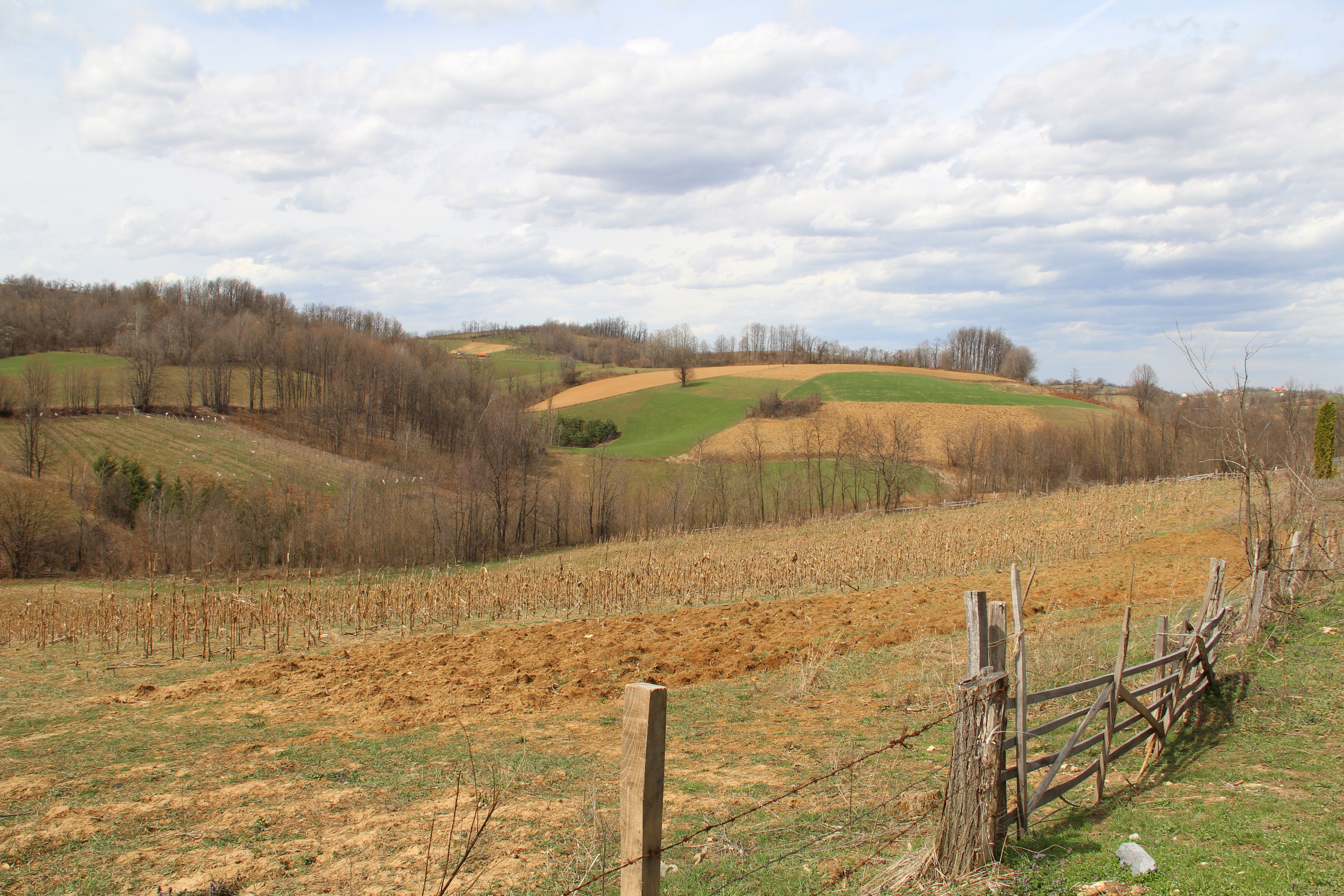
Stubo - panorama

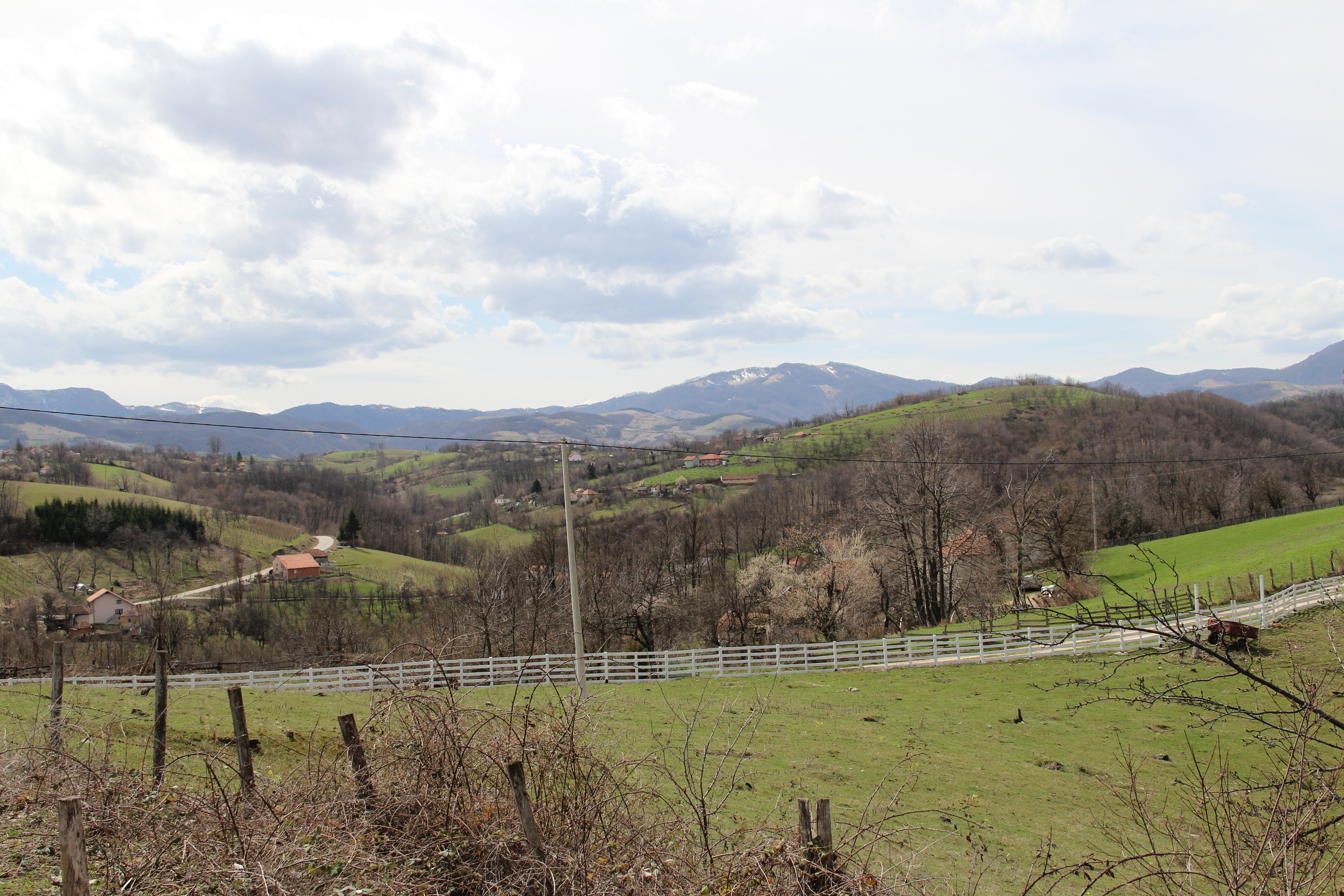
Stubo - panorama
