= Zvornik Lake =

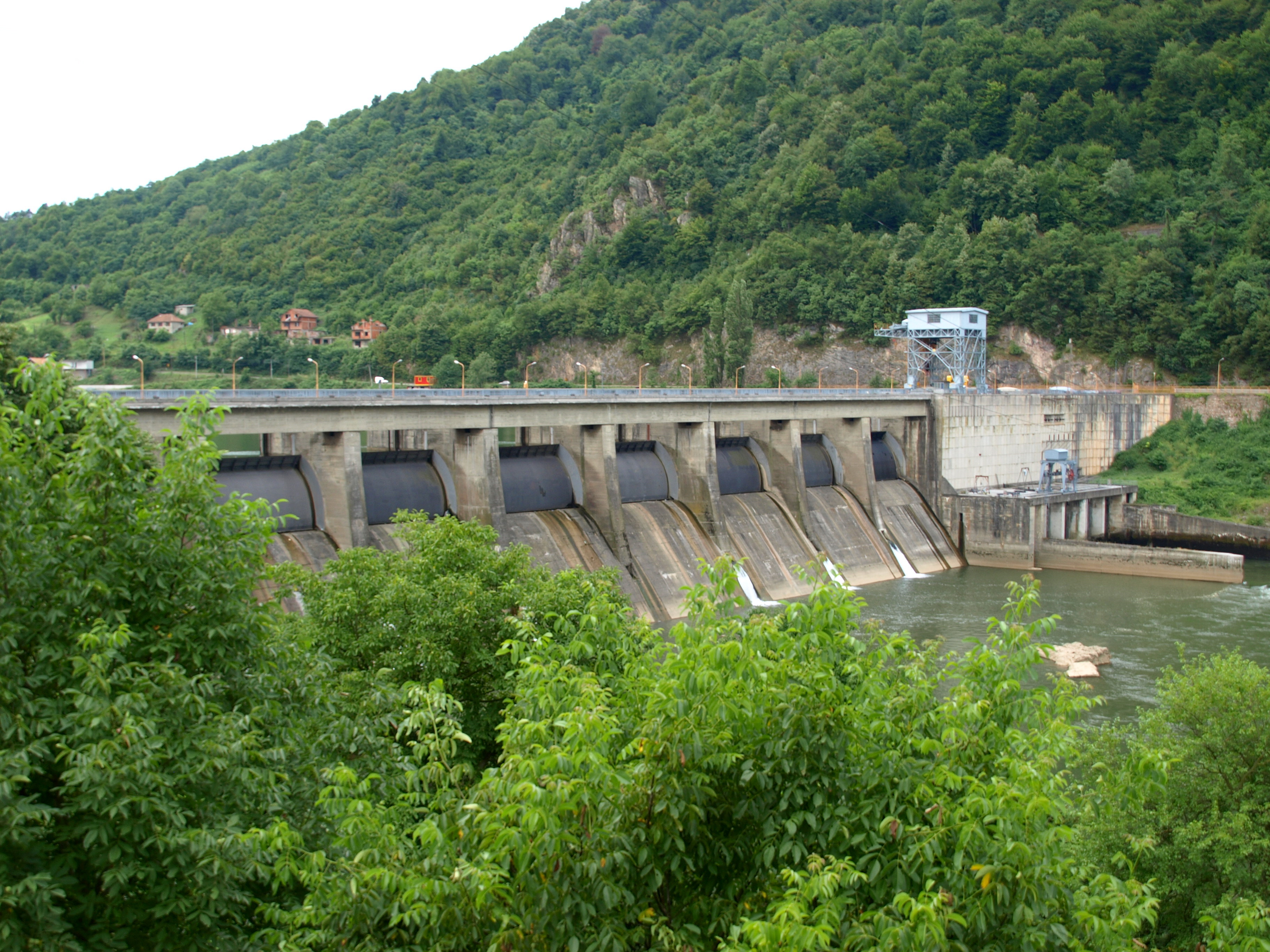

- Location within Bosnia and Herzegovina
- Interactive map of Zvornik Lake
- Location: Mali Zvornik, Mačva District
- Coordinates: 44.364°N 19.119°E
- Type: reservoir
- Basin countries: Bosnia and Herzegovina, Serbia
- Max. length: 25 km (16 mi)
- Max. width: 3 km (1.9 mi)
- Surface area: 8.1 km^{2} (3.1 sq mi)
- Average depth: 8 m (26 ft)
- Max. depth: 39 m (128 ft)
- Water volume: 90 hm^{3} (73,000 acre⋅ft)
- Surface elevation: 140 m (460 ft)

Zvornik Lake (Serbian: Зворничко језеро, Bosnian: Zvorničko jezero) is an artificial lake located on the border of Bosnia and Herzegovina and Serbia. It was created after construction of a hydroelectric power station in 1954 on the Drina river.

== Tourism ==
There is a large number of cottages and tourist catering facilities around the lake. The lake is suitable for summer vacations, sport and recreational activities on the water and fishing. Zvornik Lake is also suitable for rafting, sailing and swimming.

== Wildlife ==
The lake is known for the large wels catfishes. It is believed that the depths of the lake are inhabited by the gigantic catfishes, up to 3 m (9.8 ft) long with a weight of over 100 kg (220 lb). Such large specimens have not been caught yet and in July 2017 divers were employed to explore part of the lake. The waters of the lake are murky and at the depths of 5 to 6 m (16 to 20 ft), the visibility is zero. The divers reached 15 m (49 ft), but did not discover such large fishes, though a few days before the dive, a specimen 1.86 m (6 ft 1 in) long which weighed 37 kg (82 lb) was caught near the mouth of the Boranja River. Since 1998, an annual catfish hunt festivity Somovijada, has been held. The heaviest fish caught in the lake measured 87 kg (192 lb).

== See also ==
- List of lakes in Bosnia and Herzegovina
- List of lakes in Serbia
