= Merošina =

Merošina Мерошина (Serbian)
- Village and municipality
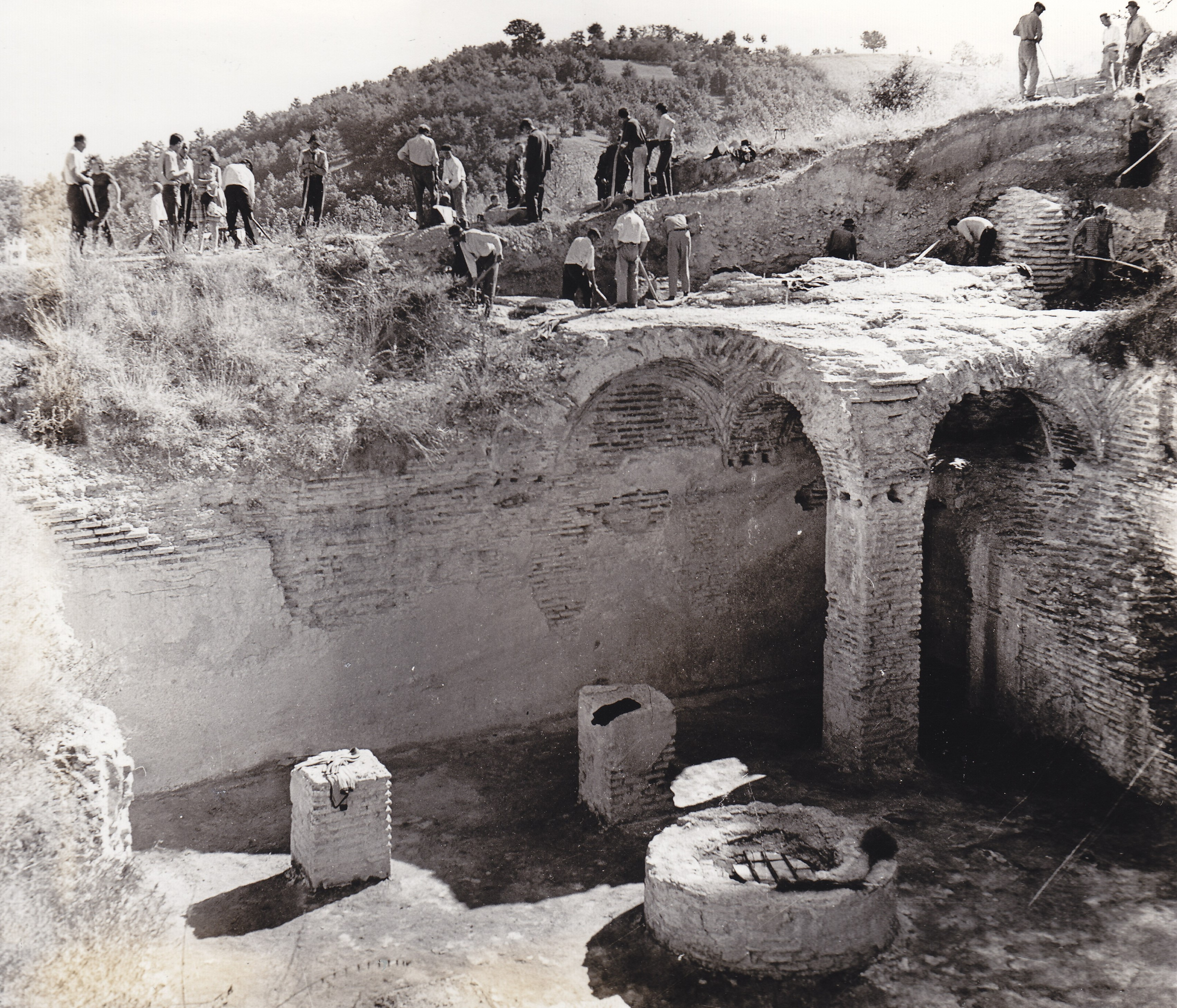
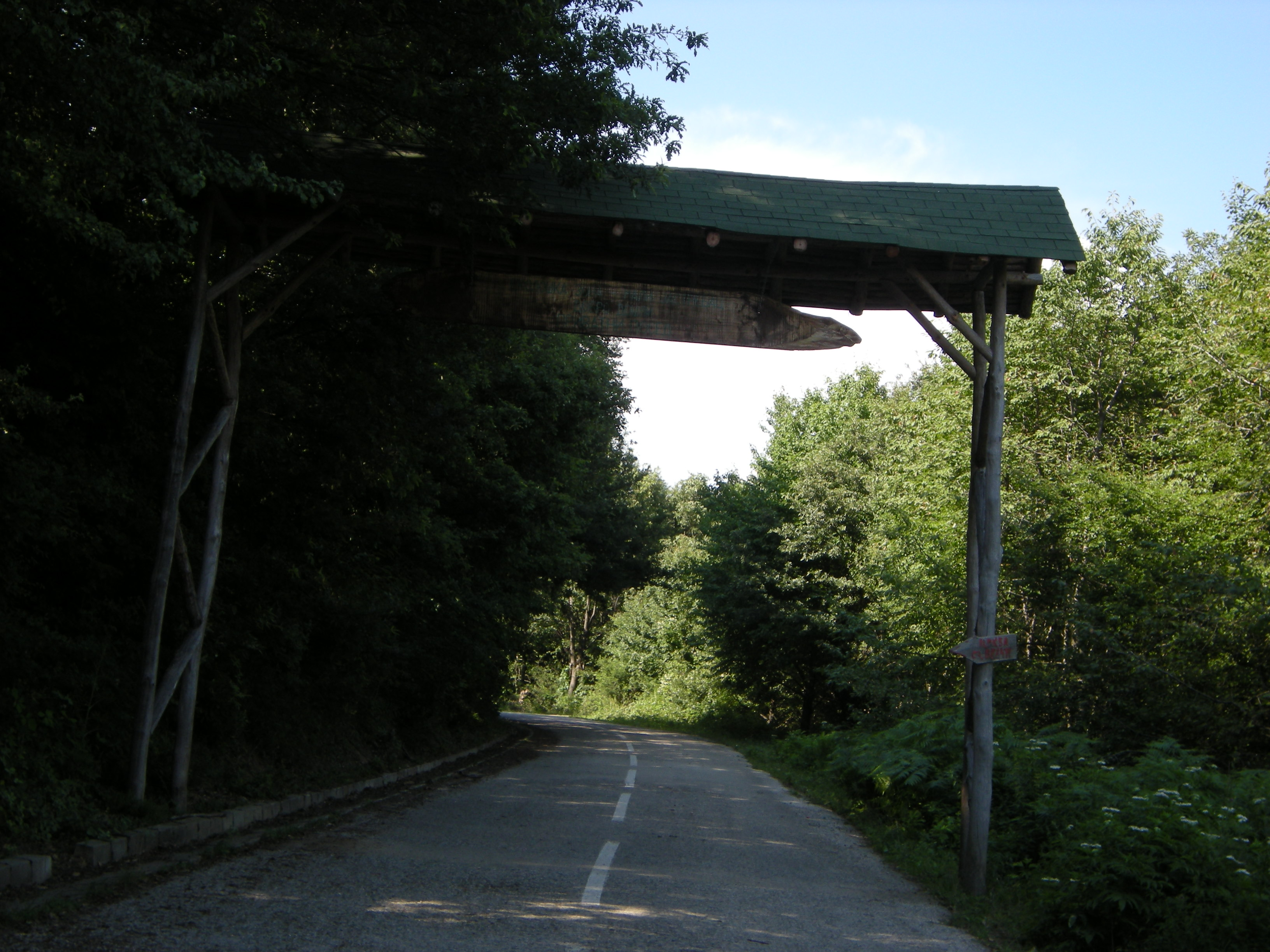
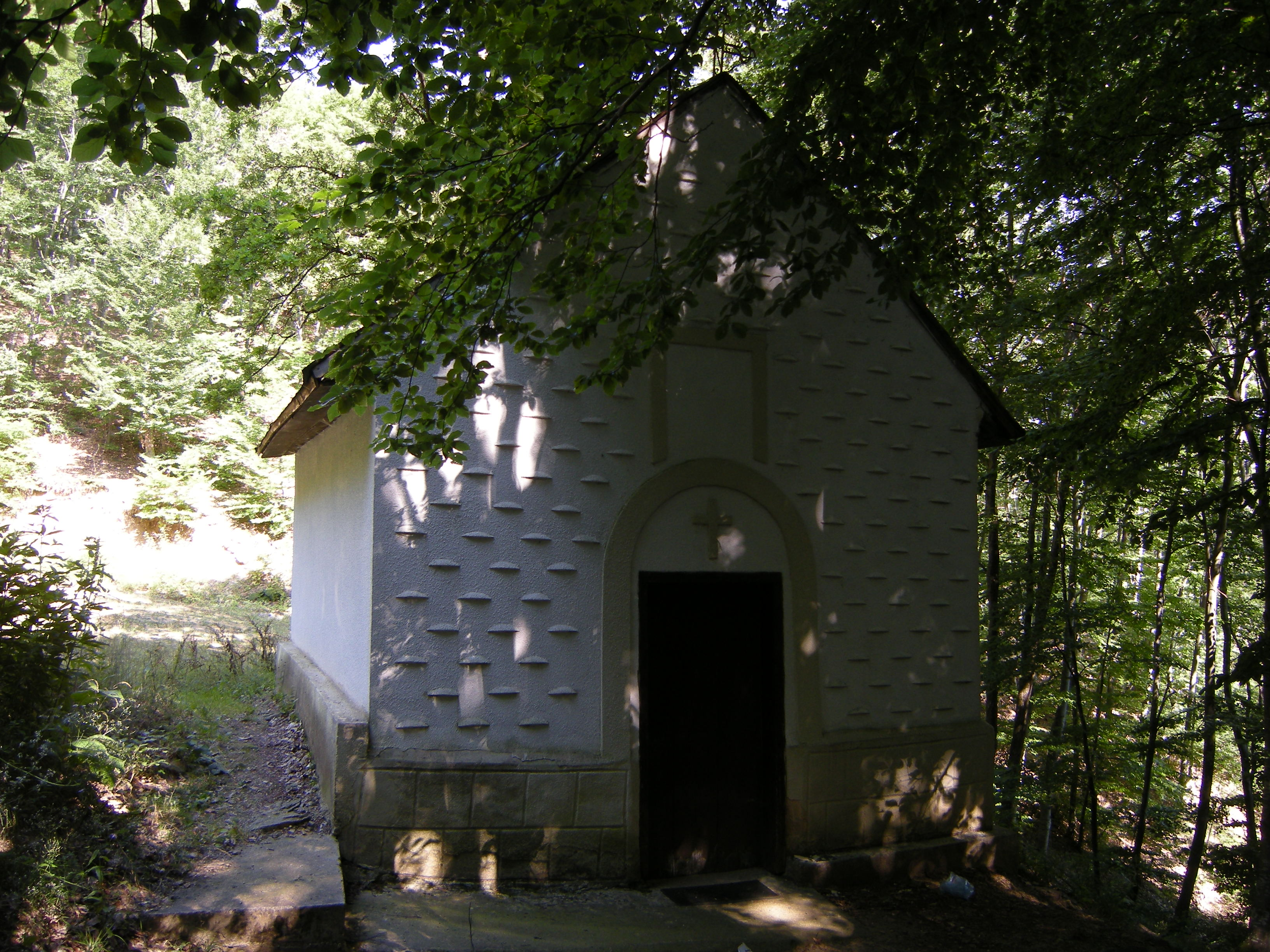

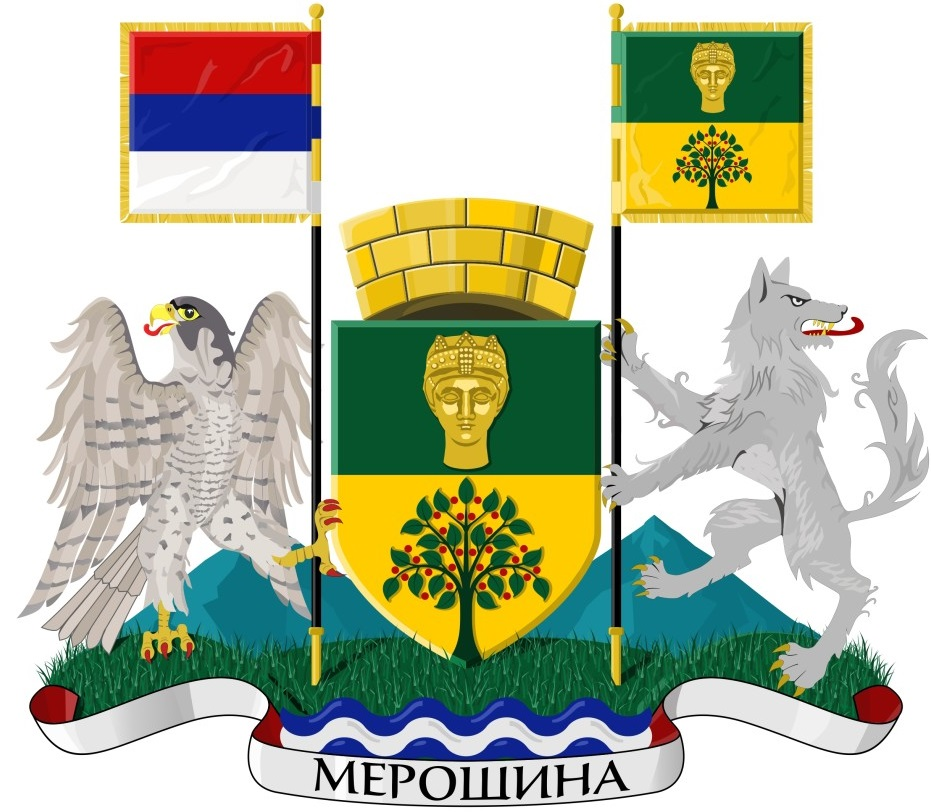
- Coat of arms

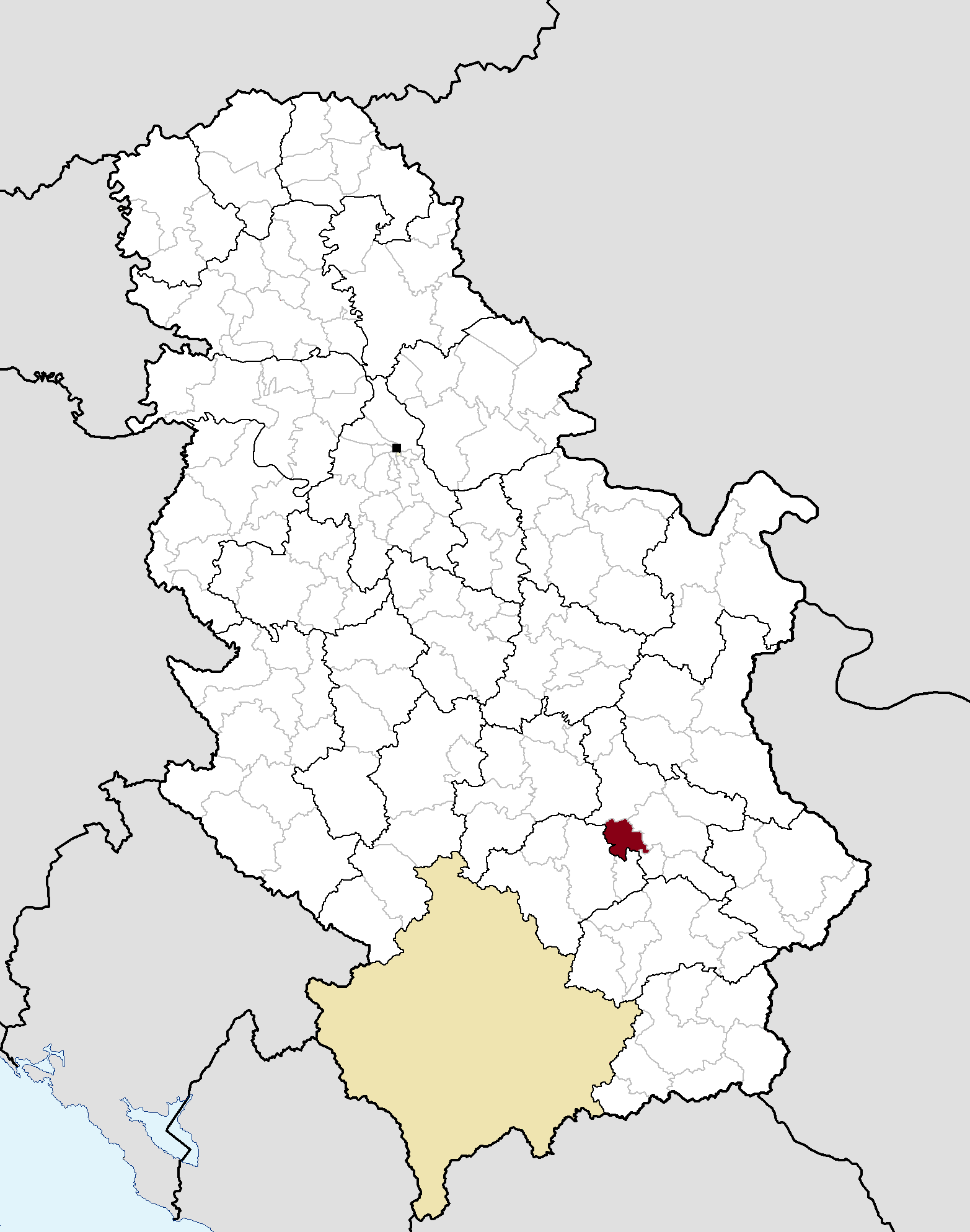
- Location of the municipality of Merošina within Serbia
- Coordinates: 43°17′N 21°43′E
- Country: Serbia
- Region: Southern and Eastern Serbia
- District: Nišava
- Settlements: 27

Government
  - Municipal Mayor: Saša Jovanović (SNS)

Area
  - Village: 4.64 km^{2} (1.79 sq mi)
  - Municipality: 193 km^{2} (75 sq mi)
- Elevation: 244 m (801 ft)

Population (2022 census)
  - Municipality: 11,873
  - Municipality density: 61.5/km^{2} (159/sq mi)
- Time zone: UTC+1 (CET)
  - Summer (DST): UTC+2 (CEST)
- Postal code: 18252
- Area code: +381(0)18
- Car plates: NI
- Website: www.merosina.org.rs

Merošina (Serbian Cyrillic: Мерошина) is a village and municipality located in the Nišava District of the southern Serbia. According to 2022 census, the municipality has 11,873 inhabitants, from which 799 live in Merošina itself.

== Geography ==
The municipality borders Aleksinac municipality in the north, City of Niš in the east, Doljevac and Žitorađa municipalities in the south, and Prokuplje municipality in the west.

== Demographics ==
Historical population
Year	Pop.	±% p.a.
1948	18,326	—
1953	19,469	+1.22%
1961	18,899	−0.37%
1971	18,028	−0.47%
1981	17,489	−0.30%
1991	16,139	−0.80%
2002	14,812	−0.78%
2011	13,968	−0.65%
2022	11,873	−1.47%

According to the 2011 census results, the municipality of Merošina has 13,968 inhabitants.

=== Ethnic groups ===
The ethnic composition of the municipality is:

Ethnic group	Population	%
Serbs	13,094	93.74%
Roma	736	5.27%
Macedonians	10	0.07%
Croats	7	0.05%
Slovenes	6	0.04%
Others	115	0.82%
Total	13,968	

== Economy ==
The following table gives a preview of total number of employed people per their core activity (as of 2017):

Activity	Total
Agriculture, forestry and fishing	9
Mining	-
Processing industry	509
Distribution of power, gas and water	13
Distribution of water and water waste management	80
Construction	91
Wholesale and retail, repair	262
Traffic, storage and communication	53
Hotels and restaurants	34
Media and telecommunications	5
Finance and insurance	3
Property stock and charter	-
Professional, scientific, innovative and technical activities	41
Administrative and other services	7
Administration and social assurance	108
Education	147
Healthcare and social work	143
Art, leisure and recreation	15
Other services	14
Total	1,533

== See also ==
- Nišava District
- Subdivisions of Serbia
