= Lisina =

Lisina or Líšina may refer to:

== Places ==
- Lisina (Raška), a village in Serbia
- Líšina, a village the Czech Republic
- Donja Lisina, a village in Bosilegrad, Serbia
- Gornja Lisina, a village in Bosilegrad, Serbia
- Jadovnik Lisina, a mountain in Drvar, Bosnia and Herzegovina
- Lisina (Bosnia and Herzegovina mountain), between the municipalities of Mrkonjić Grad and Šipovo

== People ==
- Yekaterina Lisina, Russian basketball player, and world's tallest female model as at September 2017
