= Central Bosnia =

Central region in Bosnia and Herzegovina

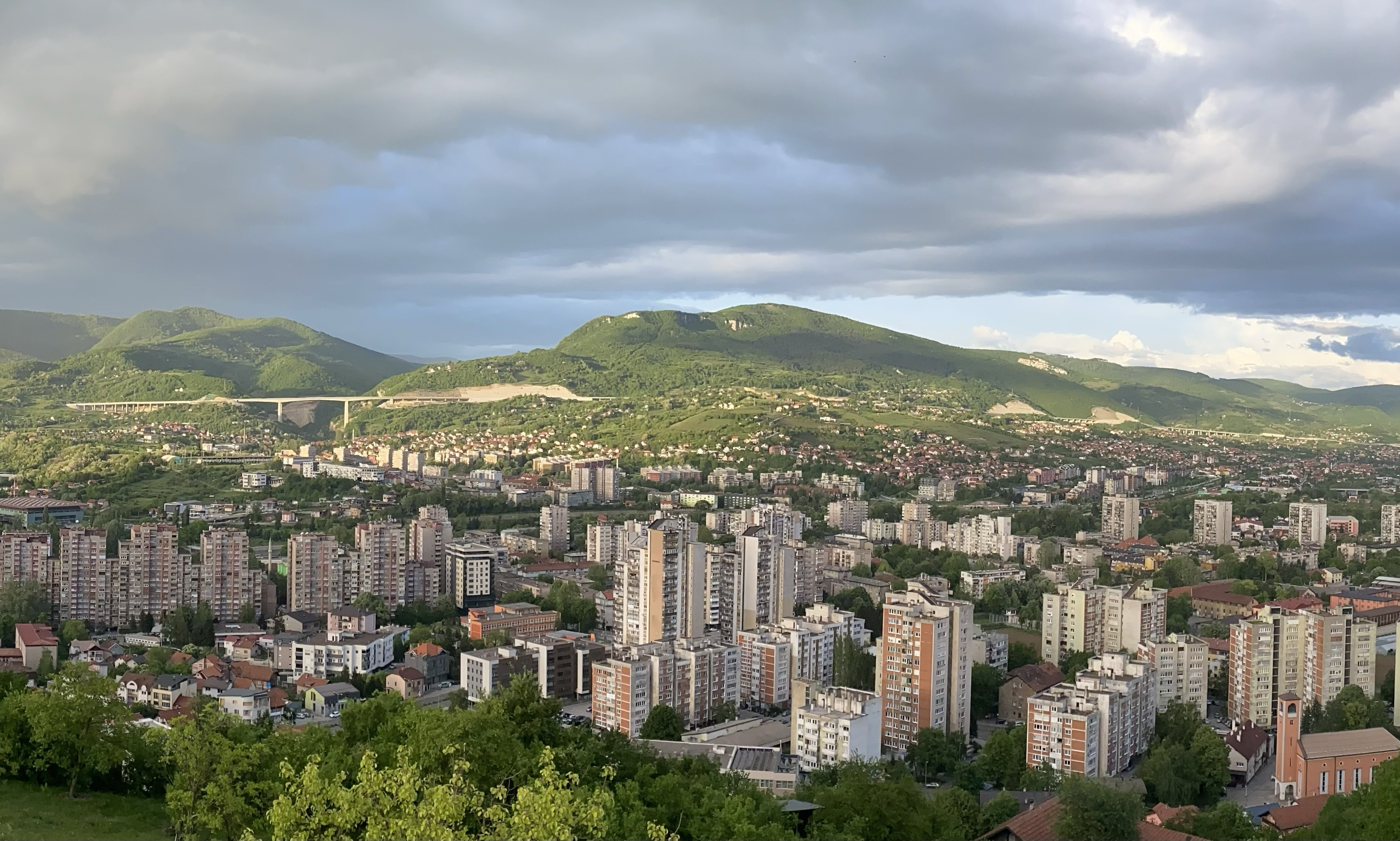
Zenica is the largest city in the Central Bosnia subregion.

Central Bosnia (Bosnian: Srednja Bosna, Croatian: Središnja Bosna) is a central subregion of Bosnia, which consists of a core mountainous area with several basins, valleys and mountains. It is bordered by Bosnian Krajina to the northwest, Tropolje (Livno area) to the west, Herzegovina to the south, Sarajevo to the east and Tuzla to the northeast. It is a part of the Federation of Bosnia and Herzegovina and is divided between the Central Bosnia Canton and the Zenica-Doboj Canton, with a population of around 800,000. The largest city in the region is Zenica, with the Sarajevo-Zenica basin being the most densely populated area. Its highest peaks are Vranica (2,110 m), Šćit (1,780 m) and Bitovnja (1,700 m).

== History ==
The area was inhabited by Neolithic farmers during the First Agricultural Revolution. The first inhabitants of the region were the Kakanj, later replaced by the Neolithic Butmir culture. The largest Butmir site is in Okolište, near Visoko At its height, with a population numbering between 1000 and 3000 inhabitants, Okolište is one of the largest Neolithic settlements in southeast Europe. Some of the first Indo-Europeans are thought to be members of eneolithic Vučedol culture (Note: Supporters of Gimbutas' "kurgan model" of Indo-European expansion identify both the preceding Baden culture and Vučedol as Indo-European speakers, though no trace of a written language for either can be expected; see Mallory and Adams, eds., Encyclopedia of Indo-European Culture, 1997; "A succession of Kurgan 'waves' of expansion was set out, the fourth influencing the Vucedol culture of Yugoslavia. This was significant for the further 'Kurganization' of Europe by the Bell Beaker people." (Colin Renfrew, Archaeology and Language: the puzzle of Indo-European origins, 1990:39)) which flourished between 3000 and 2200 BC. (Note: Dating as in Ian Shaw, ed., A Dictionary of Archaeology, 2002, and elsewhere; dating methods are discussed in Aleksandar Durman and Bogomil Obelić,Radiocarbon dating of the Vučedol culture complex, 1989.)

The Iron Age saw the emergence of the Central Bosnian cultural group, with its significant site of Fortress Pod in Bugojno. This group is commonly associated with the later Illyrian tribe of Daesitiates, which dominated Central Bosnia until the arrival of Roman Empire, when the Illyrians were conquered by Roman Emperor Augustus. The Daesitiates were the first to revolt under the leadership of Bato the Daesitiate in the Great Illyrian revolt, which began in the spring of 6 AD. The role of the Daesitiates in the rebellion would be their demise, and after subsequent Romanization, they disappeared as a distinct group.

== See also ==
- Bosnia (region)
- List of cities in Bosnia and Herzegovina
- Municipalities of Bosnia and Herzegovina
- Political divisions of Bosnia and Herzegovina

== Sources ==
- Geografski pregled. Sarajevo: Geographical Institute and Department of Geography, Faculty of Science. 1977.
