= Veliki Žep underground base (KUK-0) =

Underground military facility in Bosnia and Herzegovina

Objekat Crna Rijeka –- Veliki Žep
- KUK-0: Komunikacijsko U Komanda
- Han Pijesak; Near Han Pijesak in Bosnia and Herzegovina

Site information
- Type: Cold War nuclear bunker / Command Center
- Code: KUK-0 (- Official construction code name)
- Owner: Bosnia and Herzegovina
- Operator: Government of Bosnia and Herzegovina
- Controlled by: Ministry of Defence of BiH
- Open to the public: No
- Condition: Sealed / Preserved
- Construction Cost: ~ $1 billion (estimated value in late 1960's early 1970's currency)

Location
- Location within Bosnia and Herzegovina
- Coordinates: 44°04′21″N 19°00′44″E
- Area: 6,854 m^{2} (73,780 sq ft)

Site history
- Built: 1950's–1968
- Built for: Josip Broz Tito and the General Staff of JNA
- Built by: Socialist Federal Republic of Yugoslavia
- In use: 1969–1999 (active military secret)
- Materials: Reinforced concrete, steel, and natural rock shielding
- Fate: Preserved and sealed
- Battles/wars: Cold War (Strategic deterrent) Bosnian War (Preserved from destruction)
- Events: possible hiding place in the 1990's and 2000's for the Serb leadership accused for war-crimes

Garrison information
- Garrison: Designed for 350 personnel

Objekat Crna Rijeka / Veliki Žep, code named KUK-0, is an underground military facility under the massif of Javor and its Veliki Žep peak, near Han Pijesak, Republika Srpska, Bosnia and Herzegovina.

== History ==
After World War II, the Yugoslav People's Army built an underground military facility called "Crna Rijeka" or "Veliki Žep" in Crna Rijeka, 4 kilometers from Han Pijesak, which was to serve as a command post in the event of World War III. Construction began in the 1950s, immediately after the Informbiro resolution, and was completed in 1968.

With the collapse of Yugoslavia and the outbreak of the war in Bosnia and Herzegovina in 1992, the facility housed the General Staff of the Army of Republika Srpska. After the war and signing of Dayton Peace Agreement, there was speculation that it was providing shelter to some of the most wanted war criminals, but such claims were never proven, and they were eventually arrested in other locations.

== Construction and features ==
The complex covers an area of approximately 5,000 m². It consisted of three separate facilities: "Goljak-1" under the Veliki Žep hill, "Goljak-2" under the Bojčino Brdo hill, and "Goljak-3" under the Veliko Igrište hill. It was buried several hundred meters underground and equipped with one of the most complex telephone exchanges in Europe. After construction was completed, the building was renovated and modernized in the 1970s. The entire underground building is air-conditioned, with a temperature of 25 degrees in both summer and winter. It is built so that one can live in it for over 6 months without having to go outside. It is estimated that it could withstand a nuclear attack of approximately 10 megatons. The complex is estimated to have cost over a 1 billion dollars.

== Current status ==
By order of international military forces, IFOR, in 2005, all entrances to underground military facilities were sealed with reinforced concrete and put out of use.

== TV transmitter Veliki Žep ==
Veliki Žep, located at 1,537 meters above sea level, is a location of the TV transmitters for various radio and television stations.

== See also ==
- Armijska Ratna Komanda D-0
- Željava Air Base

== Bibliography ==
- Крсмановић, Јово; Сокановић, Саво; Косорић, Мирко (2011). Хан Пијесак : простор — вријеме — људи : монографија. Хан Пијесак. pp. 219–220. ISBN 978-86-914787-0-4.

== Спољашње везе ==
- Радио телевизија Републике Српске — Чија је војна имовина у Хан Пијеску? (ВИДЕО)
- Радио телевизија Републике Српске — покривеност и предајници
- Вечерње новости — Војно чудо труне улудо
