= Troglav (Bosnia and Herzegovina) =

Mountain in Bosnia and Herzegovina

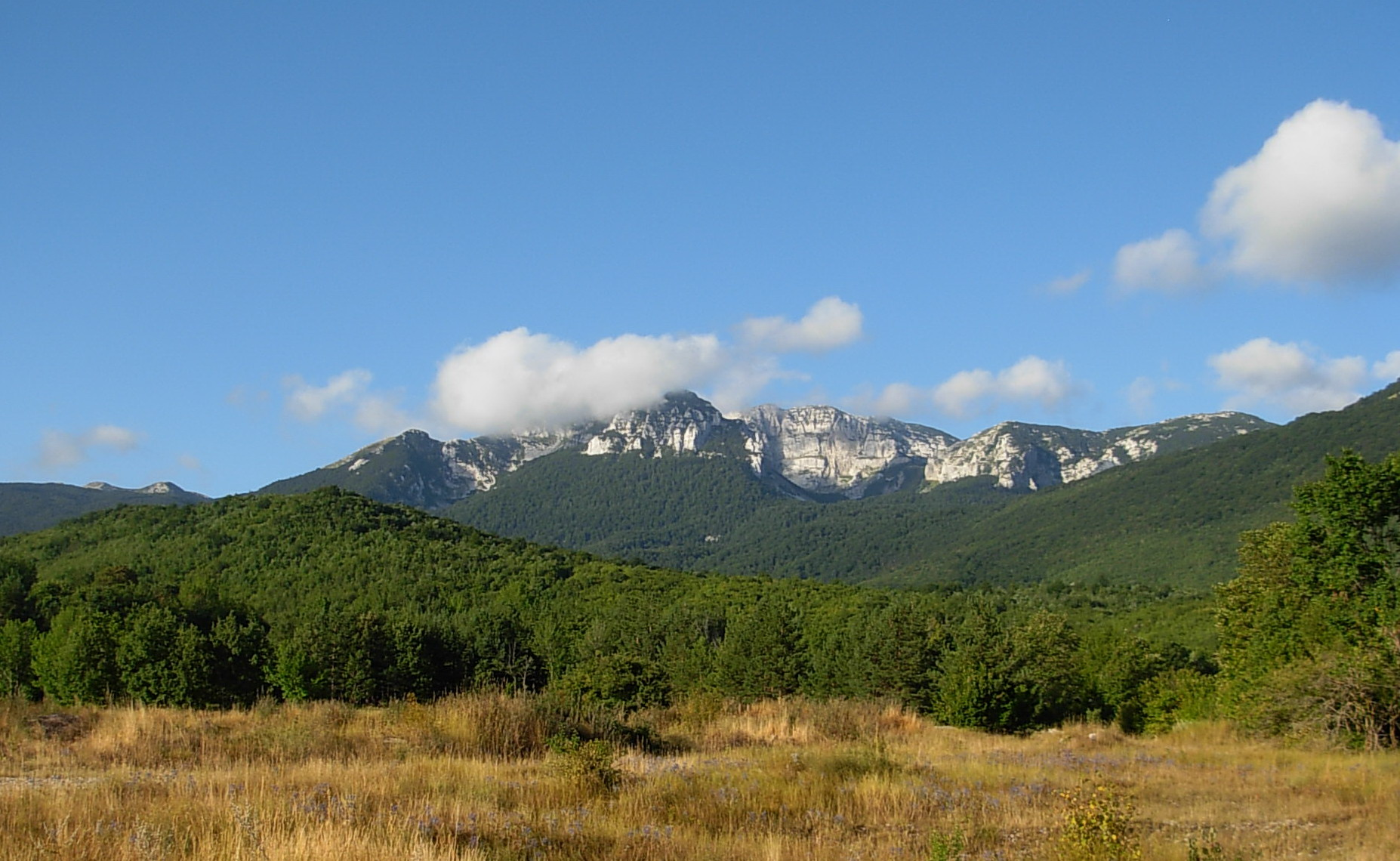

Highest point
- Elevation: 1,913 m (6,276 ft)
- Prominence: 1,051 m (3,448 ft)
- Listing: Ribu
- Coordinates: 43°57′N 16°36′E

Geography
- Location within Bosnia and Herzegovina
- Location: Bosnia and Herzegovina
- Parent range: Dinaric Alps

Troglav is the highest peak of the Dinara Mountain Range in the Dinaric Alps (also known as Dinarides). Dinara is the longest massif within karstic mountain chain of the western Balkan peninsula. Troglav is located in the territory of Bosnia and Herzegovina. It is named after Triglav, Slavic god. The name literally means "three headed".

The Troglav group is around 30 km long and around 15 km wide, making it the largest in the range. On the northwestern side, it is separated from the Dinara group by the Privija pass (1230 m) and on the southeast from the Kamešnica group by Vaganj (1173 m) road pass, which connects Sinj in Croatia with Livno in Bosnia. On the northeastern, Bosnian side, lies the huge karstic field of Livanjsko Polje (700 m), which is 65 km long. On the southwestern, Croatian side, there is the Cetina river valley with 15 km long Peruća Lake (Perućko Jezero), continuing on to the Sinjsko Polje.

The south-western slopes (Croatian side) ascend in a few steps. The first step rises up to around 1500–1600 m: up to 1100–1200 m slope is forested, mostly with oak and hornbeam, while the area above is grassy. Behind is a large depression, which is a labyrinth of peaks up to 1700 m, ridges and plateaux, which are strewn with funnel-shaped basins. On the part of the plateau called Vještičja Gora (around 1400 m), south of Troglav, there is a large complex of beech forest, which stands out against the background of grass and stone. Behind this area, the main ridge rises. From the border with the Dinara group, the main ridge gradually rises up to the summit of Troglav. Thereafter, the slopes gradually descend towards Vaganj pass, while the pasture area between them widens.

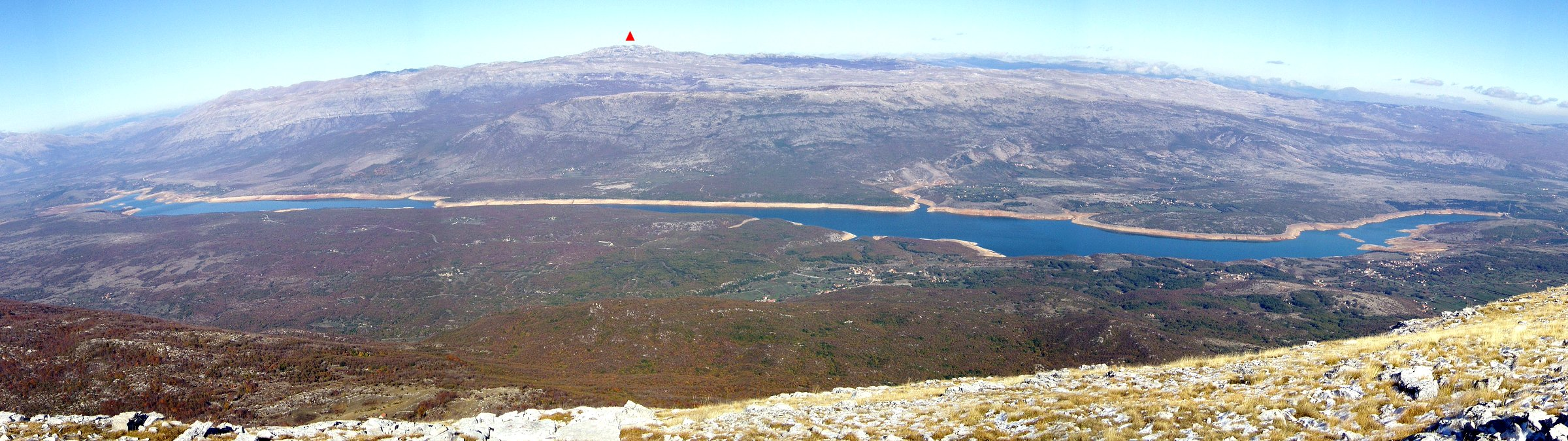
Peak Troglav (red triangle) and Peruća Lake glanced from mountain Svilaja in Croatia.

The north-eastern slopes (Bosnian side) are much steeper and mostly forested with beech and spruce. They mostly descend steeply, without steps, towards Livanjsko Polje field and end abruptly. A few kilometres north of Troglav, the only level ground appears and it contains the Velike Poljanice complex of meadows.

On the northeastern part of the group, between Bat (1851 m) and Bunjevačko Brdo (1849 m) groups of peaks, there is huge undulating grassy plateau, a few kilometres long and wide. The average altitude of the area is over 1600 m, and the region was glaciated during the ice ages.

== See also ==
- Triglav (mythology)
- Dinara peak
- List of mountains in Bosnia and Herzegovina

== Bibliography ==
=== Alpinism ===
- Poljak, Željko (February 1959). "Dinara i Troglav". Kazalo za "Hrvatski planinar" i "Naše planine" 1898—1958 (PDF). Naše planine (in Croatian). Vol. XI. p. 19. ISSN 0354-0650.

=== Biology ===
- Šašić, Martina; Nahirnić, Ana; Tarmann, Gerhard M. (2016-12-31). "Zygaenidae (Lepidoptera) in the Lepidoptera collections of the Croatian Natural History Museum". Natura Croatica: Periodicum Musei Historiae Naturalis Croatici. 25 (2): 233–248. doi:10.20302/NC.2016.25.19. eISSN 1848-7386.
