= Stražbenica =

Stražbenica may refer to:

- Stražbenica (Banovići), a village in Bosnia and Herzegovina
- Stražbenica (Kupres), a village in Bosnia and Herzegovina
- Stražbenica, Croatia, a village near Petrinja, Croatia
- Stražbenica, a mountain peak in the area of Mazinska planina, southern parts of Lička Plješivica, Croatia (1252 m)
- Stražbenica, a mountain peak in the area of Ujilica, Bosnia and Herzegovina (1184 m)
- Stražbenica, a mountain peak in the area of Paklenica, southern Velebit, Croatia (1159 m)

== See also ==
- Stražbenice
