= Kruščica (mountain) =

Mountain in Bosnia and Herzegovina

- Location within Bosnia and Herzegovina

Highest point
- Elevation: 1,673 metres (5,489 ft)
- Coordinates: 44°02′45″N 17°45′17″E

Geography
- Location: Bosnia and Herzegovina

Kruščica or Kruščićka planina (lit. "Kruščica's mountain", used to avoid confusion with eponymous river and village that are on the mountain) is a mountain in Central Bosnia, positioned between municipalities of Vitez and Busovača (with most of the mountain's landmass being in the former), Bosnia and Herzegovina. It is bordered by the town of Vitez and Vjetrenice mountain range to the north, Vilenica mountain to the northeast, Radovan mountain to the east, Vranica mountain range to the south and Busovačka planina to the west. It has an altitude of 1,673 metres (5,489 ft).

== See also ==
- List of mountains in Bosnia and Herzegovina
