= Pometenik =

Mountain in Bosnia and Herzegovina

Highest point
- Elevation: 703 m (2,306 ft)
- Coordinates: 43°28′26″N 17°48′20″E

Pometenik is a mountain in Bosnia and Herzegovina.

== Geography ==
It is located near the city of Mostar.

The mountain's highest peak has an elevation of 703 metres (2,306 ft) above sea level.

== See also ==
- List of mountains in Bosnia and Herzegovina
