= Zep =

Zep or ZEP may refer to:

- Zep (cartoonist) (real name Philippe Chappuis), the creator of comics character Titeuf
- Zep, Inc., cleaning products company
- Zeaxanthin epoxidase
- Jo Jo Zep of Australian band Jo Jo Zep & The Falcons
- Captain Zep – Space Detective, a British children's TV programme
- Led Zeppelin, as a shortened nickname
- Zero Emission Fossil Fuel Power Plants, a European organisation aiming to reduce greenhouse gas emissions
- Zep Solar, manufactures equipment for installing solar panels
- ZEP-RE, Kenyan reinsurance company
- Žep, a mountain in Bosnia and Herzegovina
- Book of Zephaniah, abbreviated Zep. or Zep
- Zep Hindle, character in Saw
- Zep, a regional term for a Submarine sandwich

== See also ==
- Zepp
- Valdis Zeps
