= KMUR =

KMUR may refer to:

- KMUR (FM), a radio station (88.3 FM) licensed to serve Bullhead City, Arizona, United States
- KTUZ (AM), a radio station (1570 AM) licensed to serve Catoosa, Oklahoma, United States, which held the call sign KMUR from 2001 to 2007

== See also ==
- Kmur, a mountain in Bosnia and Herzegovina
