= Javor (Nevesinje) =

Mountain in Bosnia and Herzegovina

Coordinates: 44°03′48″N 19°01′46″E

Javor (Cyrillic: Јавор) is a mountain in the municipality of Nevesinje, Bosnia and Herzegovina. It has an altitude of 1,553 metres (5,095 ft).

== See also ==
- List of mountains in Bosnia and Herzegovina
