= Trebačko brdo =

- Требачко брдо
- Location within Bosnia and Herzegovina

Highest point
- Elevation: 686 m (2,251 ft)
- Coordinates: 44°36′57″N 18°03′23″E

Geography
- Location: Bosnia and Herzegovina

Trebačko brdo is a mountain of Bosnia and Herzegovina. Its highest point is 686 m (2,251 ft) high.

== See also ==
- List of mountains in Bosnia and Herzegovina
