= Lunjevača =

Mountain in the Balkan region

- Location within Bosnia and Herzegovina

Highest point
- Elevation: 1,619 m (5,312 ft)
- Coordinates: 44°21′18.2″N 16°31′30.9″E

Naming
- Native name: Velika Lunjevača (Bosnian)

Geography
- Location: Bosnia and Herzegovina

Lunjevača (Cyrillic: Луњевача) is a mountain in the municipality of Drvar, Bosnia and Herzegovina. It has an altitude of 1,707 metres (5,600 ft).

== See also ==
- List of mountains in Bosnia and Herzegovina
