= Živanj =

Mountain in Gacko, Bosnia and Herzegovina

Coordinates: 43°15′N 18°33′E

Živanj (Cyrillic: Живањ) is a mountain in the municipality of Gacko, Bosnia and Herzegovina. It has an altitude of 1,696 metres (5,564 ft).

== See also ==
- List of mountains in Bosnia and Herzegovina
