= Zec (mountain) =

Mountain in Fojnica, Bosnia and Herzegovina

Coordinates: 43°54′N 17°50′E

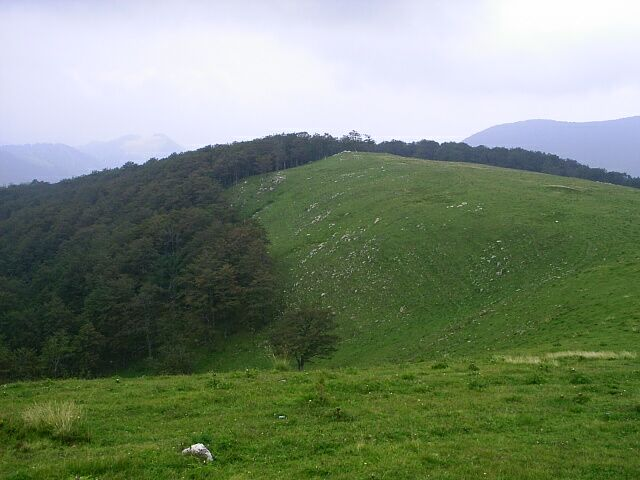
Zec Planina Mountains

Zec or Zec Planina is a mountain in the municipality of Fojnica, Bosnia and Herzegovina. It has an altitude of 1,845 metres (6,053 ft).

== See also ==
- List of mountains in Bosnia and Herzegovina

== Bibliography ==
- Guber, Mihovil (1943). "Pustošenje planinarskih objekata u južnoj Hrvatskoj" [The Desolation of Mountain Objects in Southern Croatia] (PDF). Hrvatski planinar (in Croatian). Vol. 39, no. 6–7. pp. 85–93. ISSN 0354-0650.
