= Ljubuša =

Coordinates: 43°44′N 17°23′E

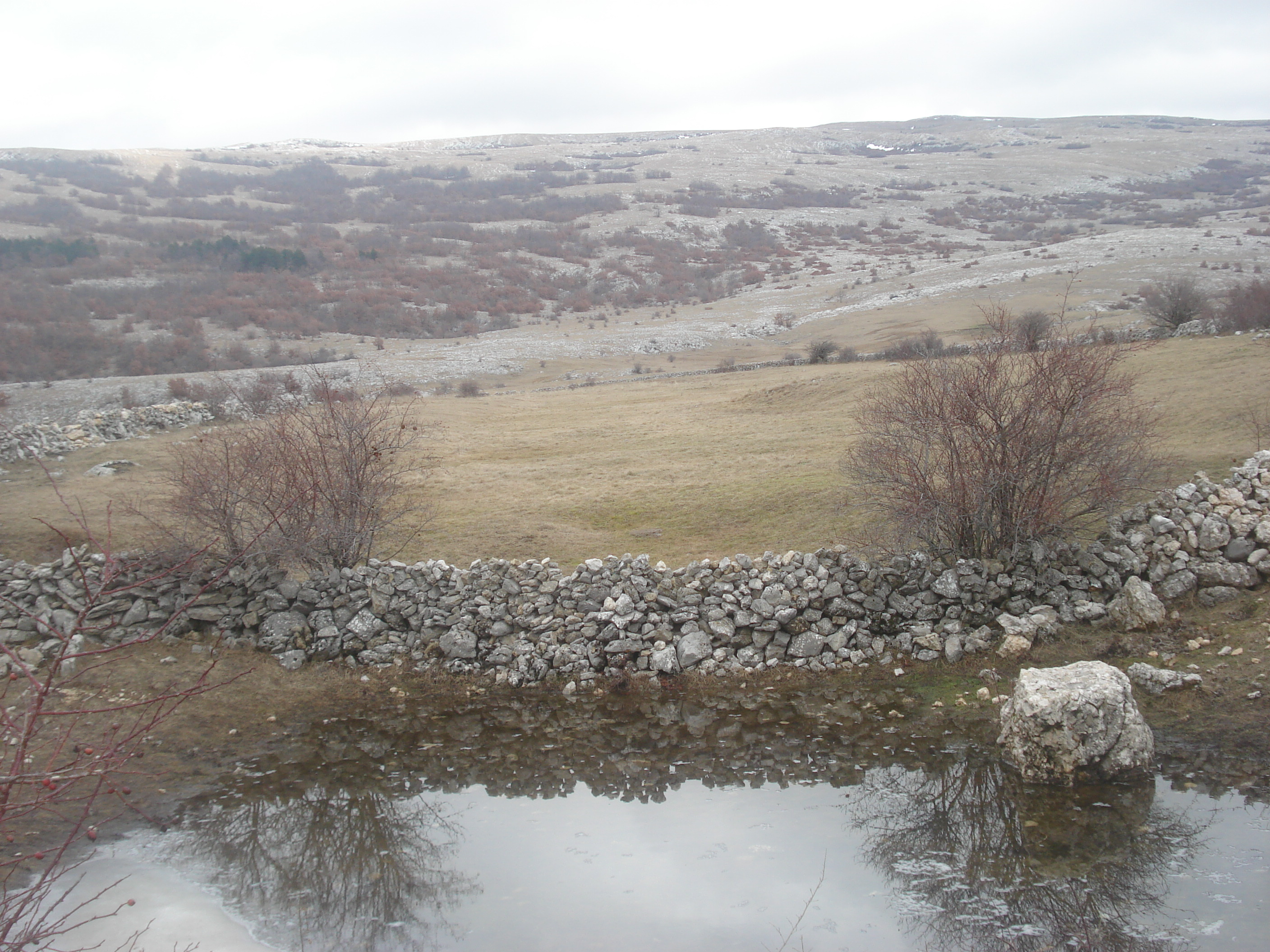
View of Ljubuša

Ljubuša is a mountain in the municipality of Tomislavgrad, Bosnia and Herzegovina. It has an elevation of 1,797 metres (5,896 ft).

== See also ==
- List of mountains in Bosnia and Herzegovina
