= Dimitor =

Mountain in Bosnia and Herzegovina

- Димитор
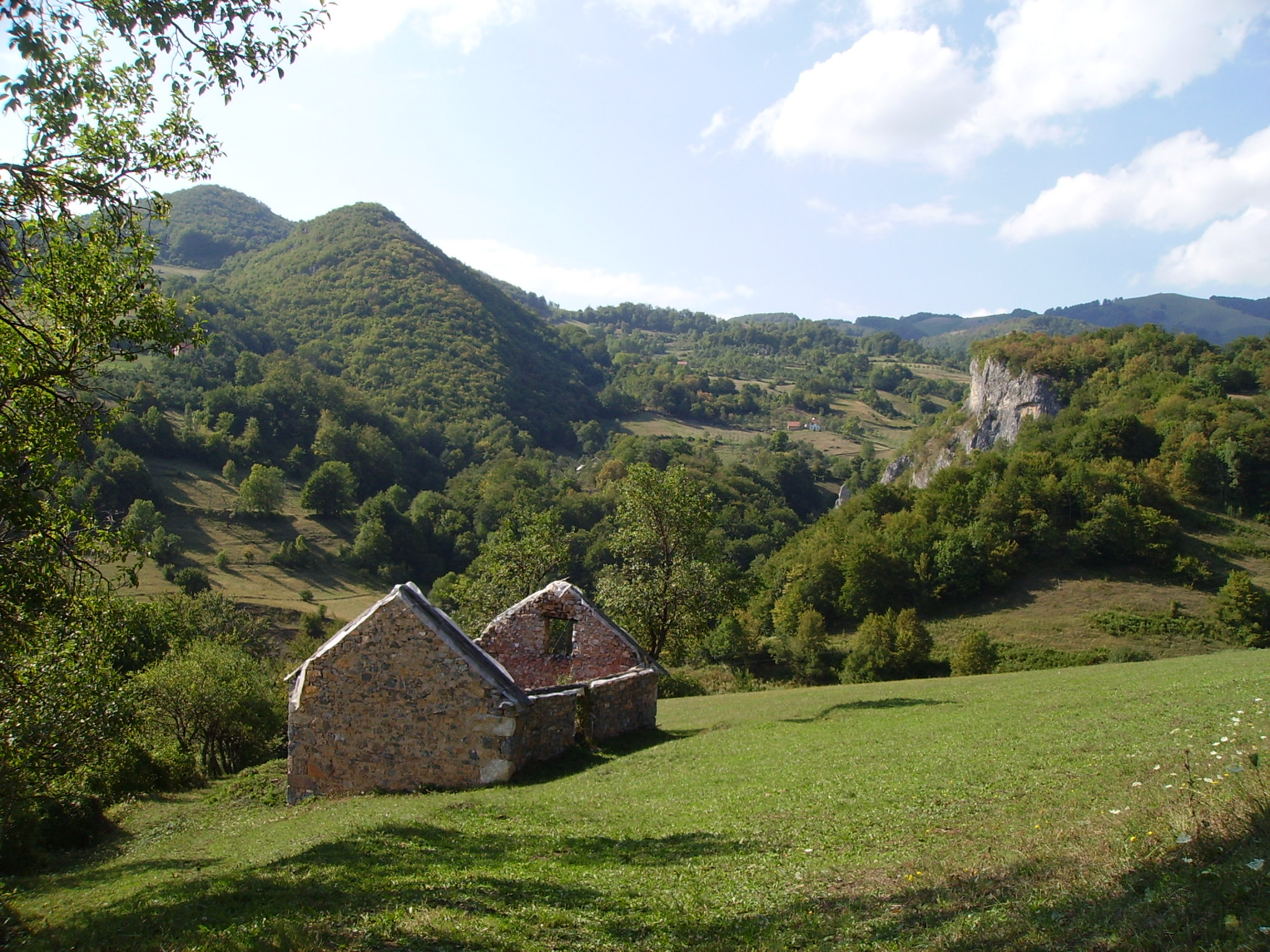
- Dimitor

Highest point
- Elevation: 1,483 m (4,865 ft)
- Coordinates: 44°24′30″N 16°55′16″E

Geography
- Location within Bosnia and Herzegovina
- Location: Bosnia and Herzegovina

Dimitor is a mountain of Bosnia and Herzegovina. Its highest peak is Mali Dimitor, at 1,483 m (4,865 ft).

== See also ==
- List of mountains in Bosnia and Herzegovina
