= Raduša (mountain) =

Mountain in Bosnia and Herzegovina

- Радуша
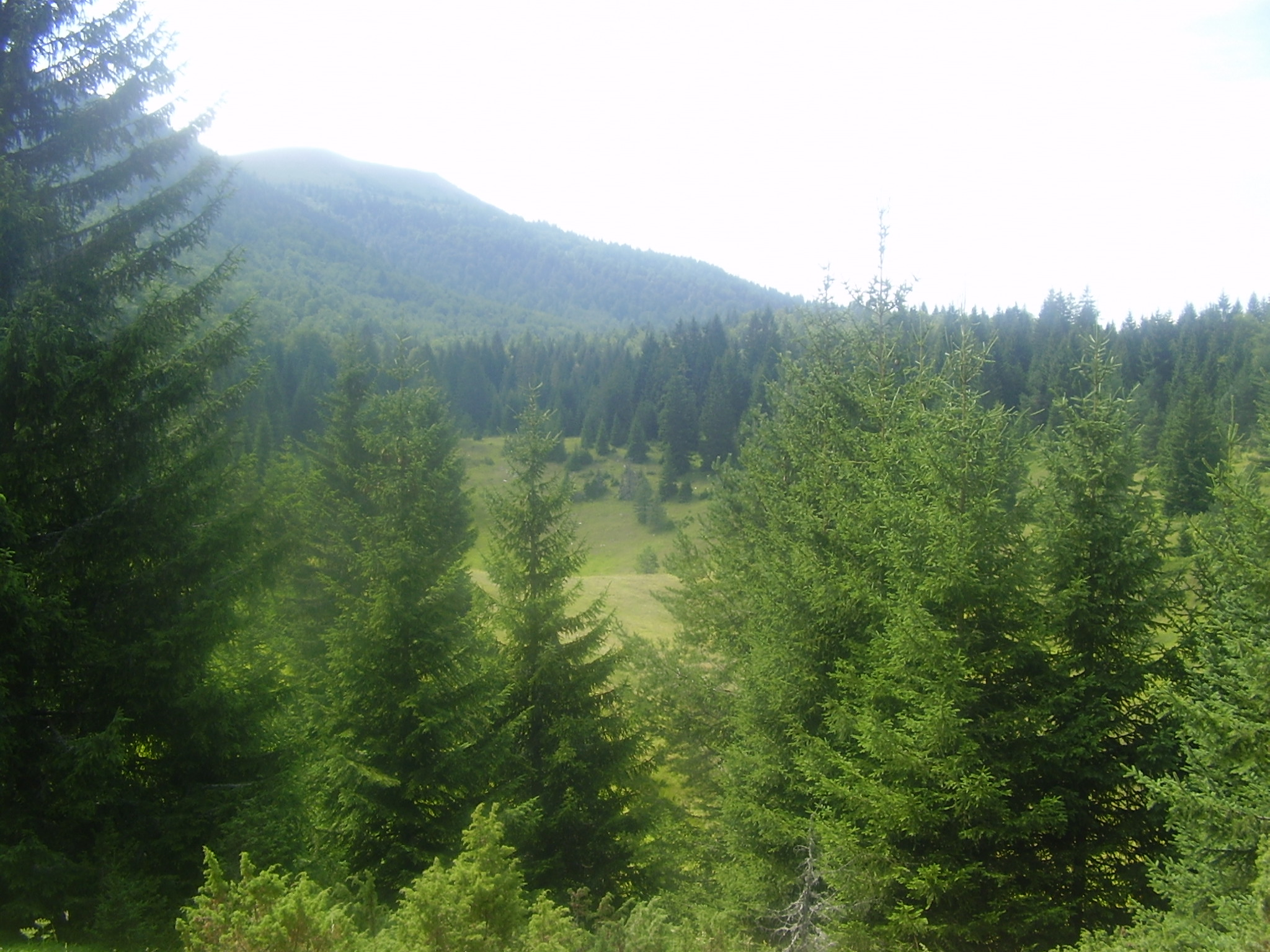

Highest point
- Elevation: 1,956 m (6,417 ft)
- Coordinates: 43°52′23″N 17°27′03″E

Geography
- Location within Bosnia and Herzegovina
- Location: Bosnia and Herzegovina
- Parent range: Dinaric Alps

Raduša (Serbian Cyrillic: Радуша) is a mountain in the Dinaric Alps of Bosnia and Herzegovina, located near Gornji Vakuf, spanning the area between Vukovsko polje in the north, the Stožer mountain in the east, the Rama basin in the south, the Makljen mountain pass in the west, near the source of the Vrbas. The highest peak is Idovac at 1,956 m (6,417 ft).
