= Massacre of villages under Kamešnica =

1944 massacre of Croats by Nazi Germany

- Part of World War II in Yugoslavia
- Location: Several villages between Kamešnica and Mosor, near Trilj
- Date: 26 - 30 March 1944
- Target: Croats
- Deaths: 1,525–3,000
- Perpetrators: Nazi Germany: 7th SS Division; 369th Infantry Division; Chetniks: Dinara Division

The massacre of villages under Kamešnica (Croatian: Pokolj u potkamešničkim selima) was the mass murder of Croat inhabitants from several villages in the Dalmatian Hinterland, between the Kamešnica and Mosor mountains, committed by the German 7th SS Division "Prinz Eugen" and local Ustaše and Chetnik forces, under German command, from the 26-30 March 1944, during World War II.

== Incident ==
It happened during the counter-insurgency operations German forces and their Ustasha allies (namely the 369th Infantry Division, under German command) launched against Partisans in the areas of the Mosor mountain. While Partisan forces managed to retreat, German forces pursued them into the Kamešnica valley, where they conducted a punitive expedition against the civilian population, suspected of harbouring Partisans. The operation began on March 26, 1944. The worst hit were areas near Trilj, namely the villages of Podi, Ruda, Otok, Voštane, Krivodol, Donji Dolac, Ljut and Rože. Villagers, mostly women, children and elderly, were shot or forced into houses, which were then set alight. Donji Dolac was the first village to be assaulted, 272 inhabitants were burned alive, including 103 children. The village of Voštane sustained the largest death toll, where between 337 and 400 civilians were killed, including 143 children.

It is estimated that at least 1,525 civilians were killed during the massacres. Other sources, based on reports given by Croatian, Partisan and Wehrmacht reports at the time, estimate that between 1,800 and 3,000 people may have been killed. According to the findings of the Hostages Trial, the number of victims was given as 2,014 dead in 22 villages.

According to General Edmund Glaise von Horstenau, SS-Obergruppenführer und General der Waffen-SS Arthur Phleps, commander of V SS Mountain Corps, acknowledged that "Chetniks wearing SS uniforms" (presumably of Dinara Division under the command of Momčilo Đujić) also took part in the massacre.

According to one Croatian-German report from 11 April 1944, Chetniks dressed in SS-uniforms, were responsible for the killings of 400 Croat civilians, from the area between Sinj and Poljica (near Split), alone.
