= Branka Raunig =

Archaeologist from Bosnia and Herzegovina (1935–2008)

- Born: 1 January 1935; Sarajevo, Kingdom of Yugoslavia
- Died: 13 June 2008 (aged 73); Bihać,Bosnia and Herzegovina
- Education: University of Belgrade
- Occupations: Archaeologist; Museum Director.

Branka Raunig (Serbian: Бранка Рауниг; 1 January 1935 – 13 June 2008) was a Bosnian archaeologist, prehistorian and museum curator.

== Early life ==
Raunig was born in Sarajevo on 1 January 1935. Her early life was spent in Kraljevo. From 1954 to 1958 she studied archaeology at the Faculty of Philosophy at the University of Belgrade. One of her tutors was Branko Gavela.

== Career ==
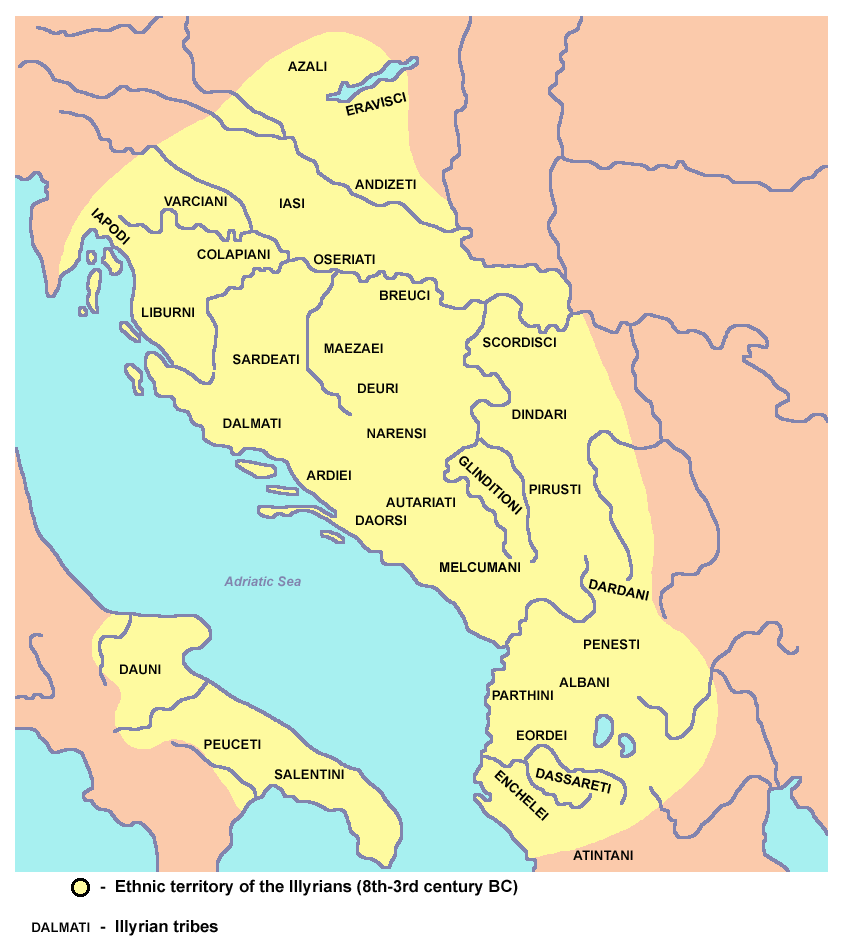
Illyrian tribes including Japodi

After graduation, Raunig moved to Bosnia Herzegovina, where she was employed at Pounje Museum in Bihać. It was working there, on the archaeological material relating to the Japodi, that a lifelong academic interest began. In 1963, Raunig moved to Museum of the Đakovo Region where she continued her work on the Japodi, with a focus on the Pounje area. Material from that region became the subject of her Masters dissertation, which she was awarded in 1971. From 1987 Raunig was director of the Pounje Museum, until her retirement in 1998. In 1992 she defended and was subsequently awarded a PhD on the art and religion of the Japodi tribe.

== Excavations ==
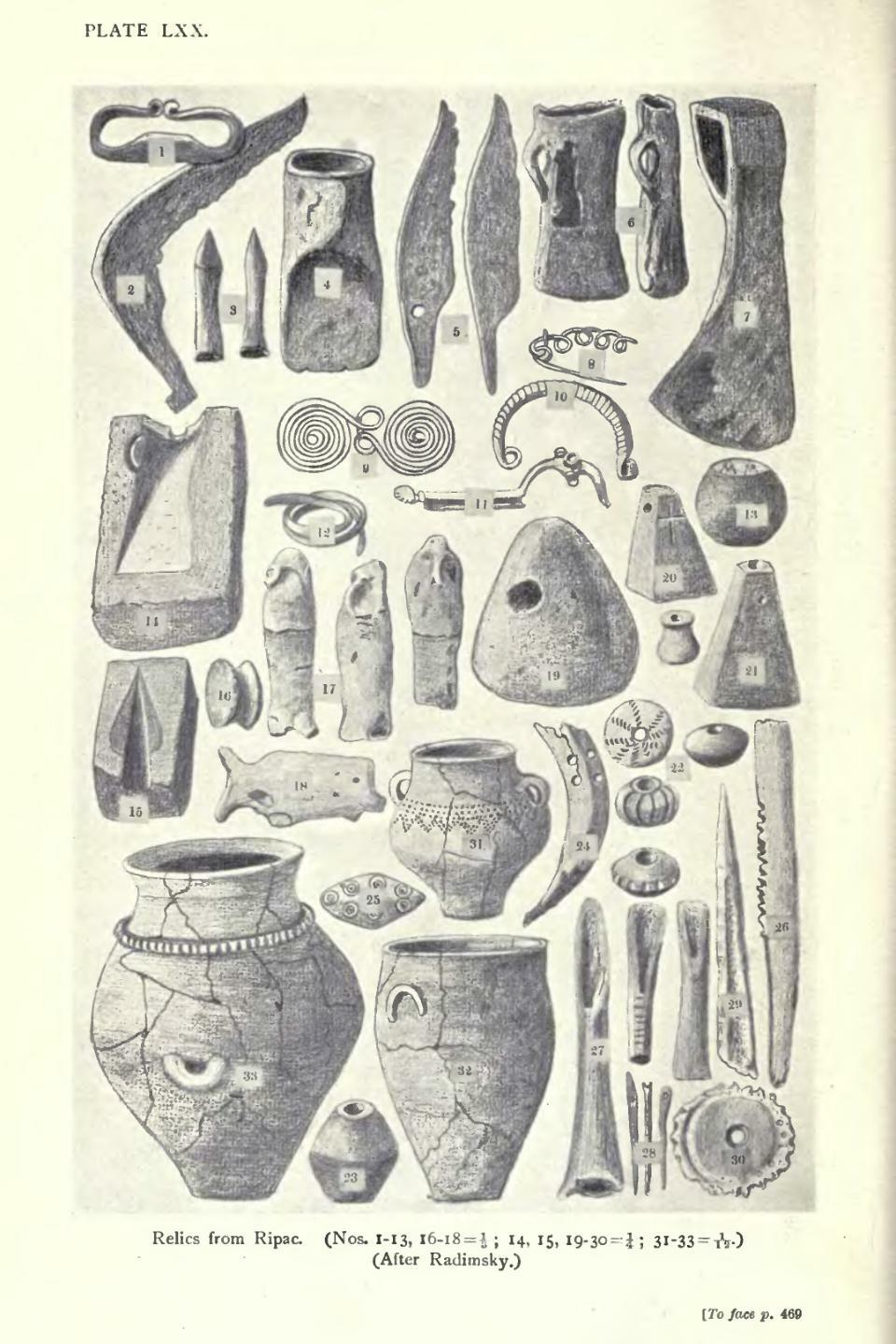
Antiquarian finds from Ripce

During her career she led excavations and published widely on a number of important sites in the region, including: Crkvina Golubić, Vranduk, Pod, Gradina and Sojeničko and a site near Gradiška. She studied the funerary archaeology at Đakovo and was instrumental in recognising the presence of a Roman site there. She also supervised excavations which discovered a mosque there. Raunig was interested in many aspects of material cultures and made a study of ceramic material at the important site of Krčana where La Tene pottery was excavated. She studied prehistoric weapons excavated in the region. Whilst Raunig's main interest lay with Bosnian prehistory, she also worked on medieval sites.

== Death ==
Raunig died in Bihać of pneumonia on 13 June 2008.
