= Hrbljina =

- Location within Bosnia and Herzegovina

Highest point
- Elevation: 1,543 metres (5,062 ft)
- Coordinates: 44°02′48″N 17°01′21″E

Naming
- Language of name: Bosnian

Geography
- Location: Bosnia and Herzegovina

Hrbljina (Cyrillic: Хрбљина) is a mountain in the municipality of Glamoč, Bosnia and Herzegovina. It has an altitude of 1,543 metres (5,062 ft).

== See also ==
- List of mountains in Bosnia and Herzegovina
