= Mjedena Glava =

- Location within Bosnia and Herzegovina

Highest point
- Elevation: 1,602 m (5,256 ft)
- Coordinates: 43°17′34″N 18°26′18″E

Geography
- Location: Bosnia and Herzegovina

Mjedena Glava (Cyrillic: Мједена Глава) is a mountain in the municipality of Gacko, Republika Srpska, Bosnia and Herzegovina. It has an altitude of 1,602 metres (5,256 ft). Mjedena Glava is situated northeast of Dabovina, in vicinity of Grušin Do.

== See also ==
- List of mountains in Bosnia and Herzegovina
