= Central Bosnian cultural group =

Bronze and Iron Age cultural group

Central Bosnian culture (Serbo-Croatian: Srednjobosanska kulturna grupa) was a cultural group that emerged during the Bronze and Iron Ages. This group inhabited the upper and mid course areas of the Vrbas river (up to Jajce) and the Bosna river (up to Zenica, but excluding the Sarajevo plain), and constituted an independent cultural and ethnic community. Hillfort-type settlements were typical of this group and were often located close to major areas of cultivable land. The standard of housing in these settlements was high. Around 120 hill forts belonging to this culture have been identified in the area of Central Bosnia. This group is commonly associated with the later Illyrian tribe of Daesitiates.

== Periodization ==
The Central Bosnian culture coexisted with the Glasinac culture. One of the most significant sites of this group is Fortress Pod in Bugojno. Fortress Pod has been declared a national monument of Bosnia and Herzegovina. Stratified material found in Fortress Pod, as well as other fortified settlements, helped define this cultural group of the late Bronze Age. Archaeologist identified 7 phases of this cultural group. Phase 1 was from middle of 11th to 8th century BC and Phase 2 was from 750/725 until 625/650 BC. Phases 3 and 4 that lasted from 625/650 till 450 BC were characterized by big fortifications like those in Lašva, Kiseljak and in Sarajevo field. This period is marked by increased use of iron. These period saw development of fortress Pod and Debelo Brdo which were important factor in the economy of wider area.

From 450 to 300 BC pottery mainly retained its style, but there is influence from Glasinac culture and early Celtic types of jewelry, buckles, rings and other items. This was a result of increased trading connections between the valleys of rivers Bosna and Vrbas to Pannonian plain and also between the valley of Neretva that was open to Adriatic Sea. Final phase laster from 3 to 1 BC that saw rapid shift to incineration of the dead. Necropolis Kamenjača in Breza contained urns and other items from Central Bosnian culture, but also Celtic and Hellenistic artifacts. There is possibility that Kamenjača was a cult place.

== Artifacts ==
Pottery had characteristic Western Balkan geometric style of late Bronze Age. It is characterized with strict symmetry and abstract art. There are numerous artifacts pointing to developed metallurgy. This culture had access to copper, gold, lead, silver and iron ore in Central Bosnia.

Right up until the beginning of 3rd century BC burial of the dead was common practice as evidenced by Warriors tomb in Vratnica, Visoko from 4th century.

== See also ==
- Illyrians
- Pod
- Glasinac culture
- Early history of Bosnia and Herzegovina

== Sources ==
- Čović, Borivoj (1983), "Srednjobosanska kulturna grupa" [Central Bosnian cultural group], Bronzano doba. Praistorija jugoslavenskih zemalja [Bronze Age: Prehistory of Yugoslav Lands] (in Serbo-Croatian), vol. 4, Svjetlost, OCLC 165779683
- Andrijana Pravidur, "Prilog poznavanju metalurških središta željeznodobnih naselja Srednje Bosne u svijetlu novih istraživanja" (A contribution to the knowledge of the metallurgical centers of the Iron Age settlements of central Bosnia) – National Museum of Bosnia and Herzegovina, Sarajevo, 2011
