= Lovnica =

Mountain in Konjic, Bosnia and Herzegovina

Coordinates: 43°39′N 18°10′E

Lovnica is a mountain in the municipality of Konjic, Bosnia and Herzegovina. It has an altitude of 1,856 metres (6,089 ft).

== See also ==
- List of mountains in Bosnia and Herzegovina
