= Bokševica =

Mountain in Bosnia and Herzegovina

- Бокшевица
- Location within Bosnia and Herzegovina

Highest point
- Elevation: 1,315 m (4,314 ft)
- Coordinates: 43°43′30″N 17°46′10″E

Geography
- Location: Bosnia and Herzegovina

Bokševica is a mountain of Bosnia and Herzegovina. It has an elevation of 1,315 m (4,314 ft) above sea level.

== See also ==
- List of mountains in Bosnia and Herzegovina
