= Slovinj =

Mountain in Bosnia and Herzegovina

- Slovinj Veliki
- Location within Bosnia and Herzegovina

Highest point
- Elevation: 1,668 m (5,472 ft)
- Coordinates: 44°01′18.89″N 16°58′19.12″E

Geography
- Location: Bosnia and Herzegovina
- Parent range: Dinaric Alps

Slovinj Veliki (Cyrillic: Словињ) is a mountain in the municipality of Glamoč, Canton 10, Federation of Bosnia and Herzegovina, Bosnia and Herzegovina. It has an altitude of 1,668 metres (5,472 ft).
Mali Slovinj is a mountain in the same municipality. It has an altitude of 1,585 metres (5,200 ft).

== See also ==
- List of mountains in Bosnia and Herzegovina
