= Bačina planina =

Mountain in Bosnia and Herzegovina

- Location within Bosnia and Herzegovina

Highest point
- Elevation: 1,530 m (5,020 ft)
- Coordinates: 43°43′04″N 17°37′52″E

Geography
- Location: Bosnia and Herzegovina
- Parent range: Dinaric Alps

Bačina planina is a mountain in the municipality of Prozor-Rama, Bosnia and Herzegovina. It has an altitude of 1,530 metres (5,020 ft).

== See also ==
- List of mountains in Bosnia and Herzegovina
