= Plazenica =

Mountain in Bosnia and Herzegovina

Coordinates: 44°02′N 17°15′E

Plazenica is a mountain in the municipality of Kupres, Bosnia and Herzegovina. It has an altitude of 1,765 metres (5,791 ft).

== See also ==
- List of mountains in Bosnia and Herzegovina
