= Srbac =

Srbac Србац
- Town and municipality
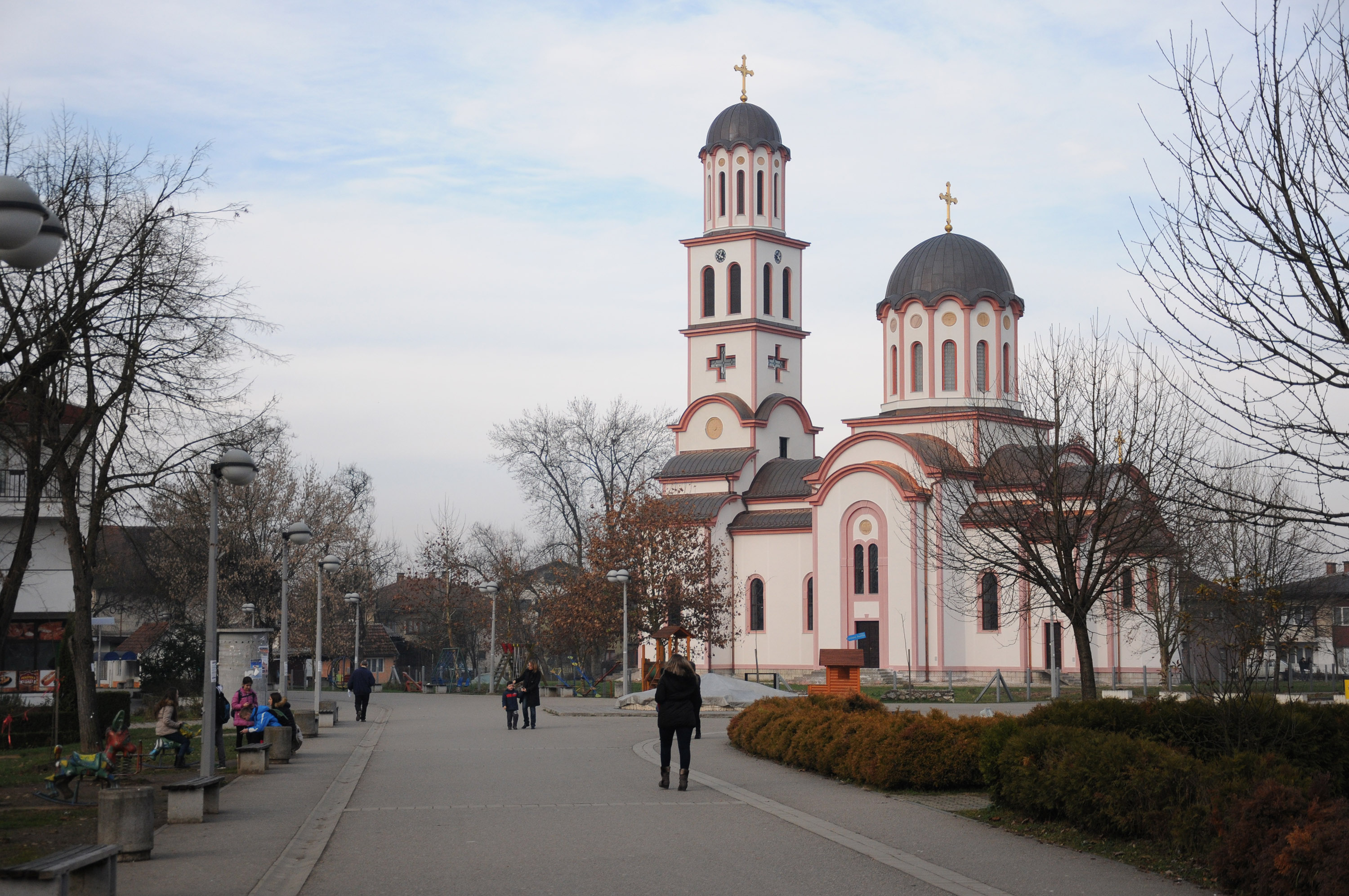

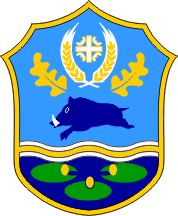
- Coat of arms

- Location of Srbac within Republika Srpska

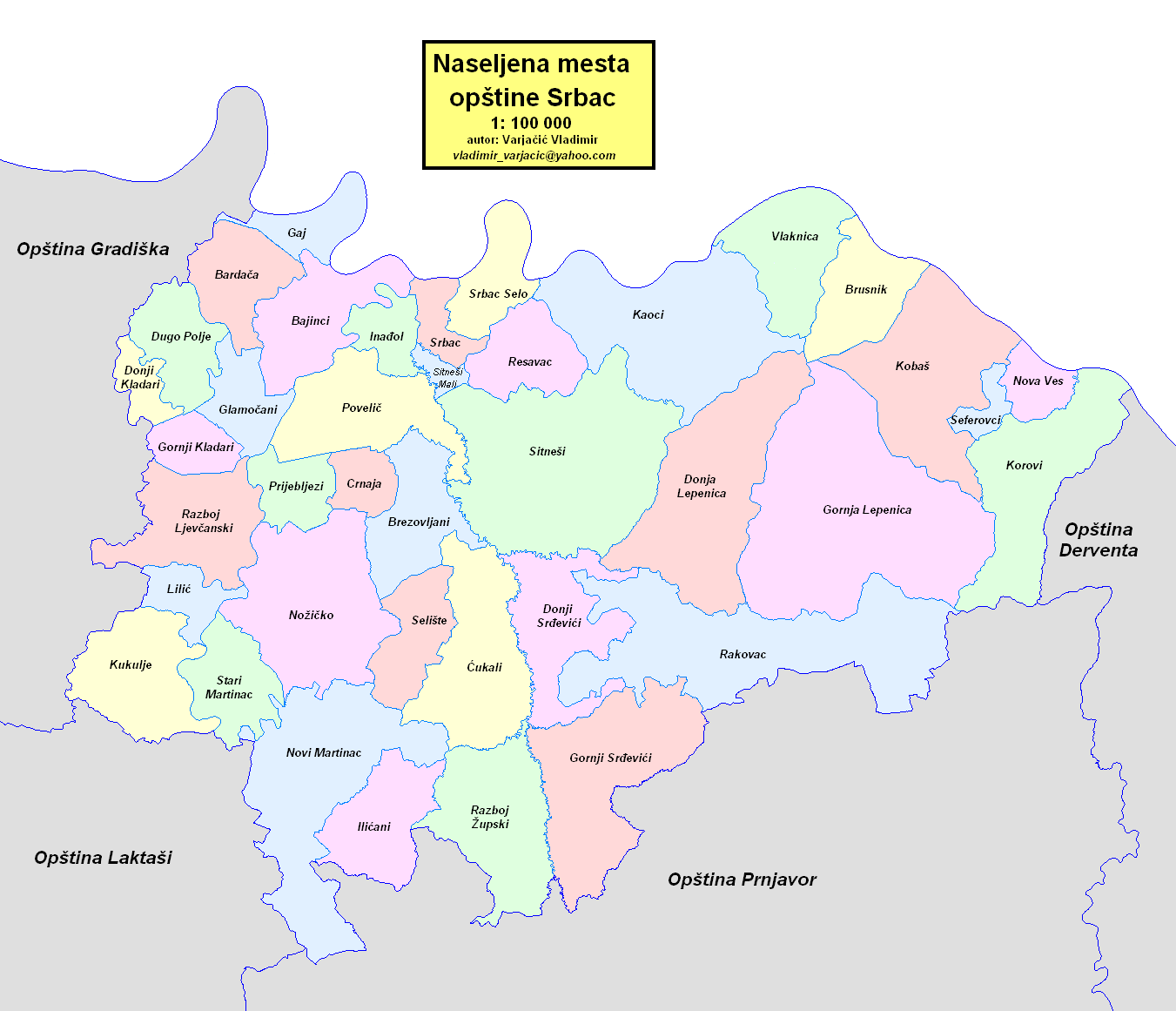
- Coordinates: 45°5′45″N 17°31′9″E
- Country: Bosnia and Herzegovina
- Entity: Republika Srpska

Government
  - Municipal mayor: Mlađan Dragosavljević (SNSD)

Area
  - Total: 452.51 km^{2} (174.72 sq mi)

Population (2013 census)
  - Total: 17,587
  - Density: 38.865/km^{2} (100.66/sq mi)
- Time zone: UTC+1 (CET)
  - Summer (DST): UTC+1 (CEST)
- Area code: 51
- Phone code: +387
- Website: www.srbac-rs.com

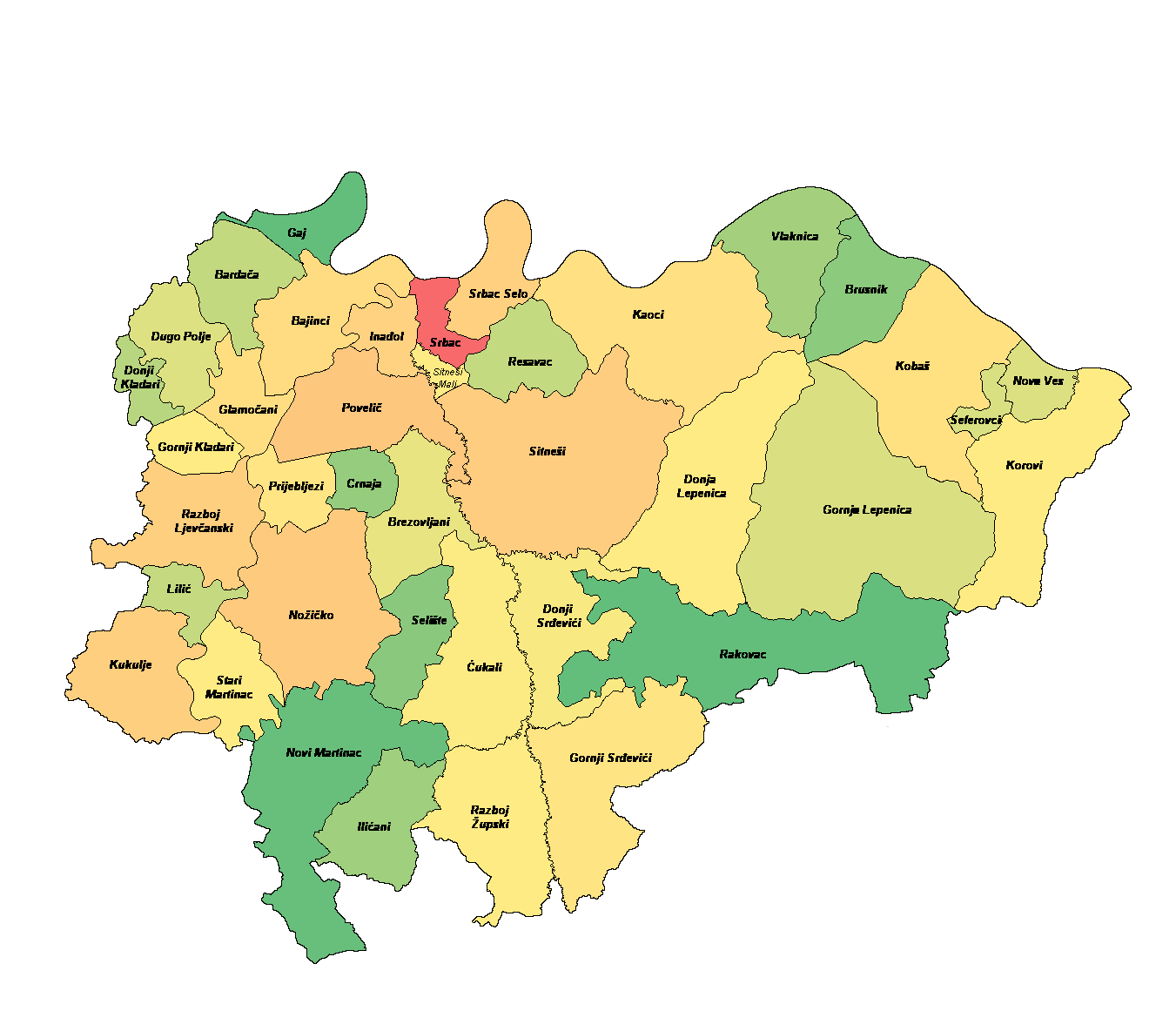
Srbac municipality by population proportional to the settlement with the highest and lowest population

Srbac (Serbian Cyrillic: Србац) is a town and municipality in Republika Srpska, Bosnia and Herzegovina. As of 2013, it has a population of 17,587 inhabitants, while the town of Srbac has a population of 2,707 inhabitants.

== Geography ==
=== Physical geography ===
The municipality of Srbac is situated at the coordinates of 45.5°N 17.31°E on the right bank of the Sava, across Davor, at the confluence of the Vrbas into Sava, and about 20 km (12 mi) downstream from Gradiška.

The area around Srbac is mountainous woodland to the south-east (40% of the total area) and farmland to the south-west (60% of total area). The city itself is built in the Pannonian plain, which is located on the transition between low mountain areas and flat farmlands. The mountain ranges to the south-east are called Motajica and the highest peak is called Gradina at 652m above sea level. The lowest point is 89m in the small village of Vlaknica along the Sava river.

=== Political geography ===
The Municipality of Srbac is located in the northeastern part of Bosnia and Herzegovina and borders the municipalities of Derventa, Prnjavor, Laktaši and Gradiška and has a 42 km long border with Croatia. The Municipality of Srbac covers an area of 453 km^{2} (174.9 mi^{2}) and consists of 39 villages.

=== Climate ===
Srbac has a temperate climate, with cold winters and warm summers. The warmest month of the year is July, with an average temperature of 22.1 °C (71.8 °F). The coldest month of the year is January, when temperatures average 1.2 °C (34.2 °F). Annual precipitation for Srbac is about 770 mm. Due to the city's high latitude; it snows in Srbac almost every year as well. Strong winds come from the north and northeast bringing much snow.

Climate data for Srbac (1991–2020)
Month	Jan	Feb	Mar	Apr	May	Jun	Jul	Aug	Sep	Oct	Nov	Dec	Year
Mean daily maximum °C (°F)	4.9 (40.8)	7.7 (45.9)	13.1 (55.6)	18.3 (64.9)	23.0 (73.4)	26.9 (80.4)	29.1 (84.4)	29.2 (84.6)	23.4 (74.1)	18.0 (64.4)	11.4 (52.5)	5.5 (41.9)	17.5 (63.5)
Daily mean °C (°F)	1.2 (34.2)	3.0 (37.4)	7.2 (45.0)	11.8 (53.2)	16.3 (61.3)	20.4 (68.7)	22.1 (71.8)	22.0 (71.6)	17.0 (62.6)	12.0 (53.6)	6.8 (44.2)	2.0 (35.6)	11.8 (53.2)
Mean daily minimum °C (°F)	−2.1 (28.2)	−1.1 (30.0)	2.2 (36.0)	6.0 (42.8)	10.6 (51.1)	14.4 (57.9)	15.9 (60.6)	15.6 (60.1)	11.2 (52.2)	7.0 (44.6)	3.1 (37.6)	−1.1 (30.0)	6.8 (44.2)
Average precipitation mm (inches)	43.8 (1.72)	40.6 (1.60)	49.9 (1.96)	59.6 (2.35)	76.9 (3.03)	84.5 (3.33)	62.2 (2.45)	65.3 (2.57)	80.3 (3.16)	76.2 (3.00)	70.6 (2.78)	59.3 (2.33)	769.3 (30.29)
Average precipitation days (≥ 1.0 mm)	8.6	8.6	9.4	10.6	11.5	9.5	8.8	7.6	9.6	9.6	10.5	10.5	114.9
Source: NOAA

== History ==
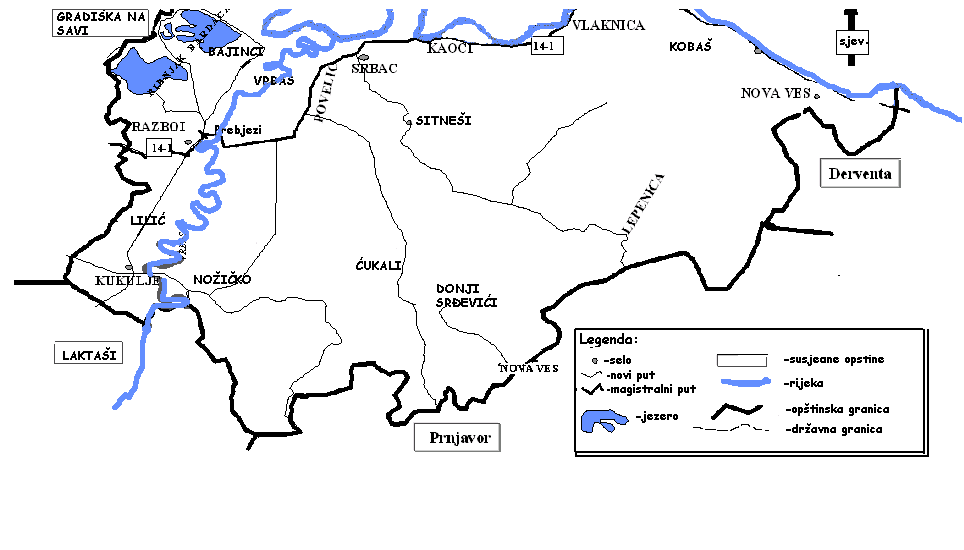
Map of the Srbac municipality

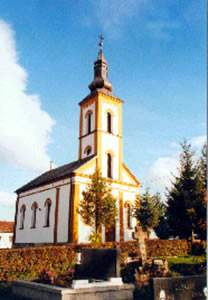
Serbian Orthodox Church

Archaeological evidence points to an Iron Age settlement existing in the region (Cagan grad). Before the collapse of the Western Roman Empire the town was mentioned in this area. As throughout in the Balkans during Ottoman occupation, towns were constantly burnt and destroyed. In the cadastral area of modern Srbac the historical town of Svinjar existed (meaning "swine stable").

=== Ottoman era ===
At the time of the Long War (1591–1606), Ahmet Hafiz-pasha transported his huge army from Ottoman-held Slavonia across the Sava at Svinjar further into Bosnia (1596). During Ottoman occupation the region was part of the Sanjak of Bosnia. Svinjar was one of the important rebel sites in Bosnia during the Herzegovina Uprising (1875–78) against the Ottoman Empire; one of the battles took place here on 21 November 1875 at a place called Srbac where hajduks of Motajica burnt down and destroyed an Ottoman military camp.

=== Austria-Hungary ===
In the late 19th century Svinjar was under Austro-Hungary. In 1888 a primary school was opened in Svinjar. Between the years of 1899 to 1921 around 7,000 Poles and around 5,000 Ukrainians migrated and settled in the area. Towards the end of 1929 a medical centre was also opened in Svinjar. On 2 November 1933 the minister of internal affairs of the Kingdom of Yugoslavia changed the town name into Srbac.

=== Yugoslavia ===
During World War II these parts were frequently invaded by all the warring sides. During the 1970s Srbac saw rapid growth with the opening of a new textile factory and a packaging material factory. However, economic growth stopped during the Bosnian War. Srbac was bombarded 3 times during the war by Croatian forces in the summer of 1992 only. No one was killed in these 3 incidents and Srbac suffered only minor structural damage.

== Demographics ==
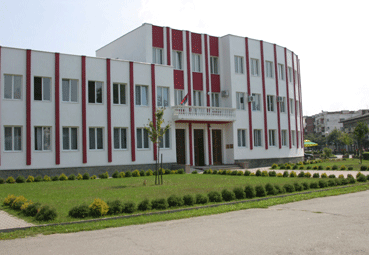
City Council building.

=== Population ===
According to the 2013 census results, the municipality has 17,587, while the town of Srbac had a population of 2,707 inhabitants.

Population of settlements – Srbac municipality
	Settlement	1948.	1953.	1961.	1971.	1981.	1991.	2013.
	Total				21,226	22,336	21,840	17,587
1	Bajinci						900	621
2	Bardača						269	195
3	Brezovljani						292	267
4	Brusnik						176	86
5	Vlaknica						247	133
6	Gaj						5	3
7	Glamočani						615	559
8	Gornja Lepenica						351	240
9	Gornji Kladari						392	316
10	Gornji Srđevići						608	455
11	Donja Lepenica						537	326
12	Donji Kladari						222	172
13	Donji Srđevići						393	302
14	Dugo Polje						332	247
15	Ilićani						207	124
16	Inađol						785	779
17	Kaoci						797	528
18	Kobaš						1,014	509
19	Korovi						534	317
20	Kukulje						950	842
21	Lilić						315	199
22	Nova Ves						377	243
23	Novi Martinac						15	13
24	Nožičko						1,117	916
25	Povelič						1,219	982
26	Pribljezi						562	432
27	Razboj Župski						481	312
28	Razboj Ljevčanski						903	845
29	Rakovac						36	6
30	Resevac						242	196
31	Selište						134	81
32	Seferovci						307	238
33	Sitneši						1,207	871
34	Sitneši Mali						490	314
35	Srbac	573	492	789	1,437	2,442	3,043	2,707
36	Srbac Selo						824	822
37	Stari Martinac						452	323
38	Ćukali						380	308
39	Crnaja						110	104

=== Ethnic composition ===
Ethnic composition – Srbac town
	2013.	1991.	1981.	1971.
Total	2,707 (100,0%)	3,043 (100,0%)	2,442 (100,0%)	1,437 (100,0%)
Serbs		2,605 (85,61%)	1,840 (75,35%)	1,285 (89,42%)
Yugoslavs		209 (6,868%)	394 (16,13%)	10 (0,696%)
Others		124 (4,075%)	71 (2,907%)	28 (1,949%)
Croats		54 (1,775%)	65 (2,662%)	46 (3,201%)
Bosniaks		51 (1,676%)	33 (1,351%)	39 (2,714%)
Montenegrins			29 (1,188%)	22 (1,531%)
Macedonians			7 (0,287%)	2 (0,139%)
Albanians			3 (0,123%)	
Roma				4 (0,278%)
Slovenes				1 (0,070%)

Ethnic composition – Srbac municipality
	2013.	1991.	1981.	1971.
Total	17,587 (100,0%)	21,840 (100,0%)	22,336 (100,0%)	21,226 (100,0%)
Serbs	16,630 (94,56%)	19,382 (88,75%)	19,175 (85,85%)	19,469 (91,72%)
Bosniaks	417 (2,371%)	940 (4,304%)	800 (3,582%)	1 018 (4,796%)
Others	409 (2,326%)	567 (2,596%)	557 (2,494%)	454 (2,139%)
Croats	131 (0,745%)	140 (0,641%)	172 (0,770%)	203 (0,956%)
Yugoslavs		811 (3,713%)	1 543 (6,908%)	34 (0,160%)
Montenegrins			57 (0,255%)	27 (0,127%)
Albanians			12 (0,054%)	5 (0,024%)
Macedonians			11 (0,049%)	4 (0,019%)
Slovenes			6 (0,027%)	8 (0,038%)
Roma			3 (0,013%)	4 (0,019%)

== See also ==
- Municipalities of Republika Srpska
