= Javor (Bosnia and Herzegovina) =

Mountain in Bosnia and Herzegovina

Coordinates: 44°04′N 19°02′E

Javor (Cyrillic: Јавор) is a mountain in the municipality of Han Pijesak, Vlasenica, Olovo, Milići, and Kladanj, Bosnia and Herzegovina. Massif of the Javor is over 30 kilometers long, with the highest peak, Veliki Žep, at the altitude of 1,537 metres (5,043 ft). "Objekat Veliki Žep", an underground military base, code named KUK-0, is located under the Veliki Žep peak.

== See also ==
- List of mountains in Bosnia and Herzegovina
