= Ravašnica =

Mountain in Bosnia and Herzegovina

- Location within Bosnia and Herzegovina

Highest point
- Elevation: 1,565 metres (5,135 ft)
- Coordinates: 43°51′09″N 17°21′59″E

Geography
- Location: Bosnia and Herzegovina
- Parent range: Dinaric Alps

Ravašnica (Cyrillic: Равашница) is a mountain in the municipality of Kupres, Canton 10 of the Federation of Bosnia and Herzegovina, Bosnia and Herzegovina. It has an altitude of 1,565 metres (5,135 ft).

== See also ==
- List of mountains in Bosnia and Herzegovina
