= Dinara =

Mountain range in the Dinaric Alps

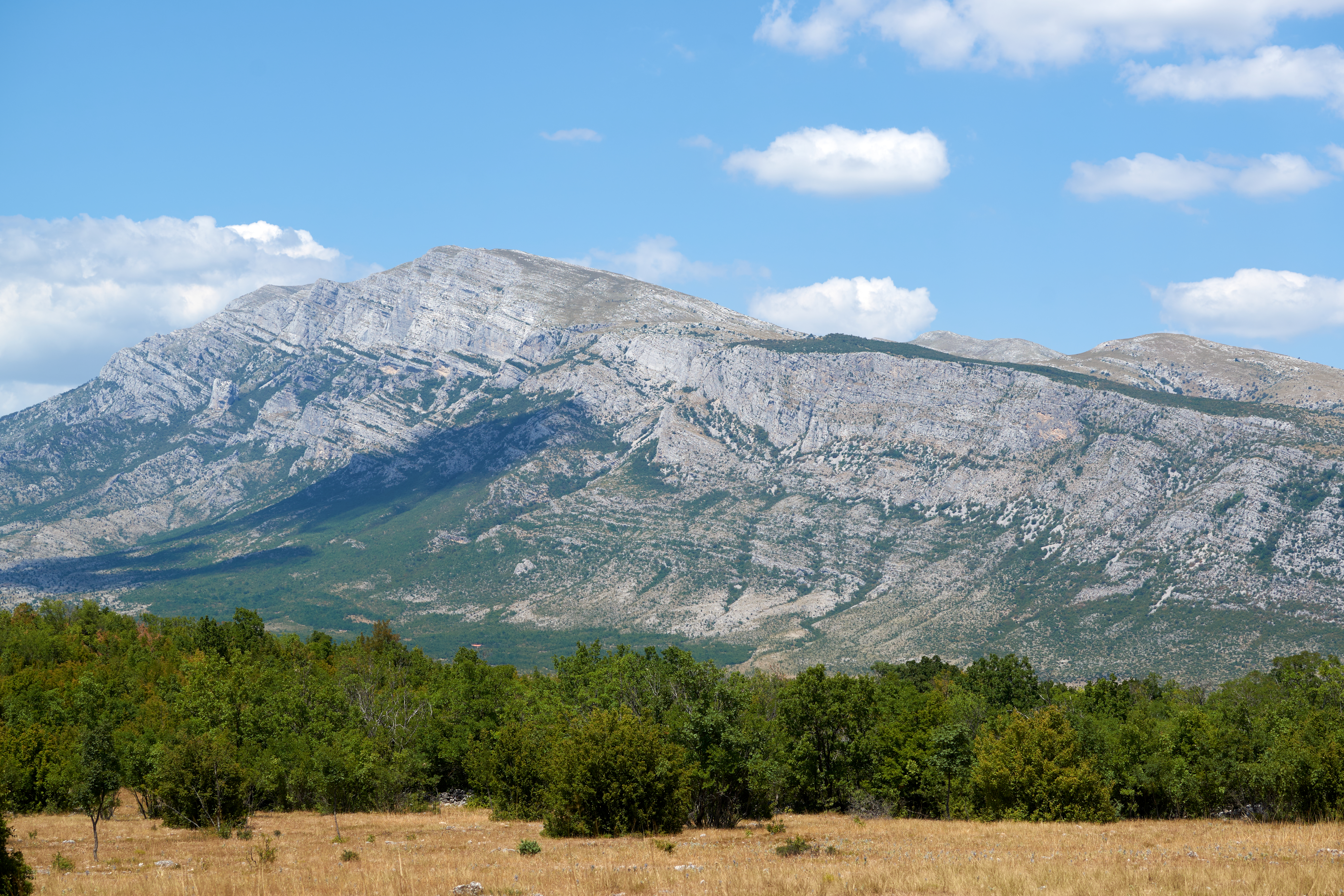
- Dinara from Cetina.

Highest point
- Elevation: 1,913 m (6,276 ft)
- Prominence: 1,086 m (3,563 ft)
- Listing: Country high point
- Coordinates: 43°56′42″N 16°35′49″E

Geography
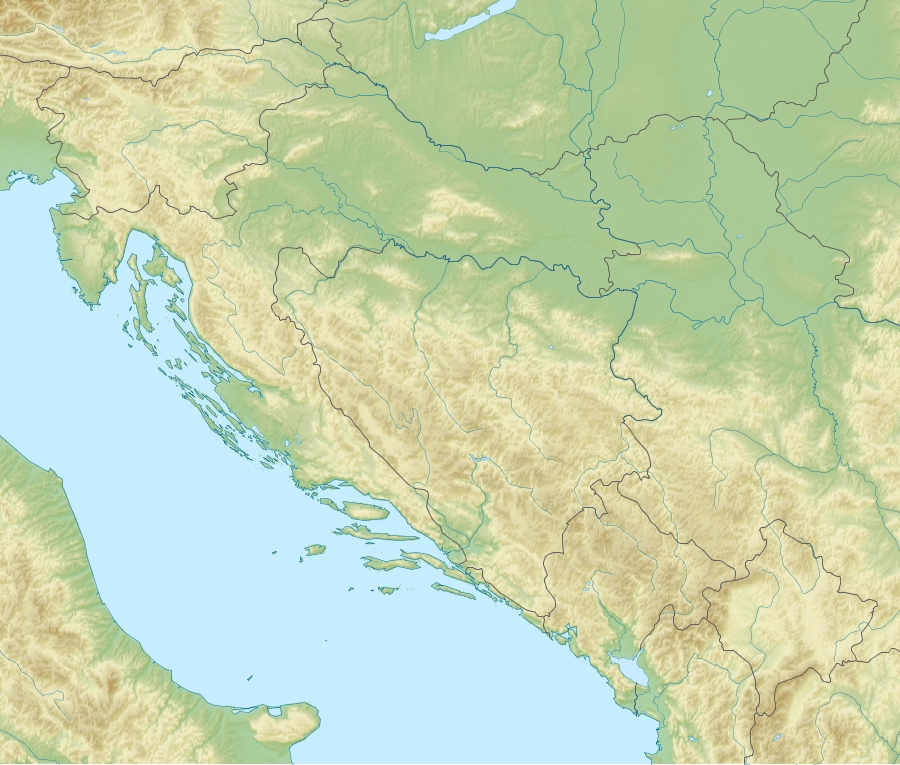
- Location within Dinaric Alps
- Location: Bosnia and Herzegovina / Croatia
- Parent range: Dinaric Alps

Dinara is a 100-kilometre-long (60-mile) mountain range in the Dinaric Alps, located on the border of Bosnia and Herzegovina and Croatia. It has four major mountains or peaks, from north-west to south-east:

- Ilica or Ujilica (1,654 m)
- Sinjal or Dinara (1,831 m), eponym to the range, highest mountain in Croatia
- Troglav (1,913 m), highest peak in the range
- Kamešnica, with peak Konj (1,855 m)

Note the dual use of the name Dinara, which is also the origin of the name for the whole Dinaric Alps. The range is composed of limestone and dolomite.

== Etymology ==
The origin of the name is uncertain. It may derive from a forgotten Illyrian tribe name, or it is named after a settlement in or near the region. According to Šišić, the Dinara name resembles the name of the Dindari, an Illyrian tribe that inhabited the western bank of the Drina Valley.

Subdivision of the Dinaric Alps, with the Dinara range shown as B8.

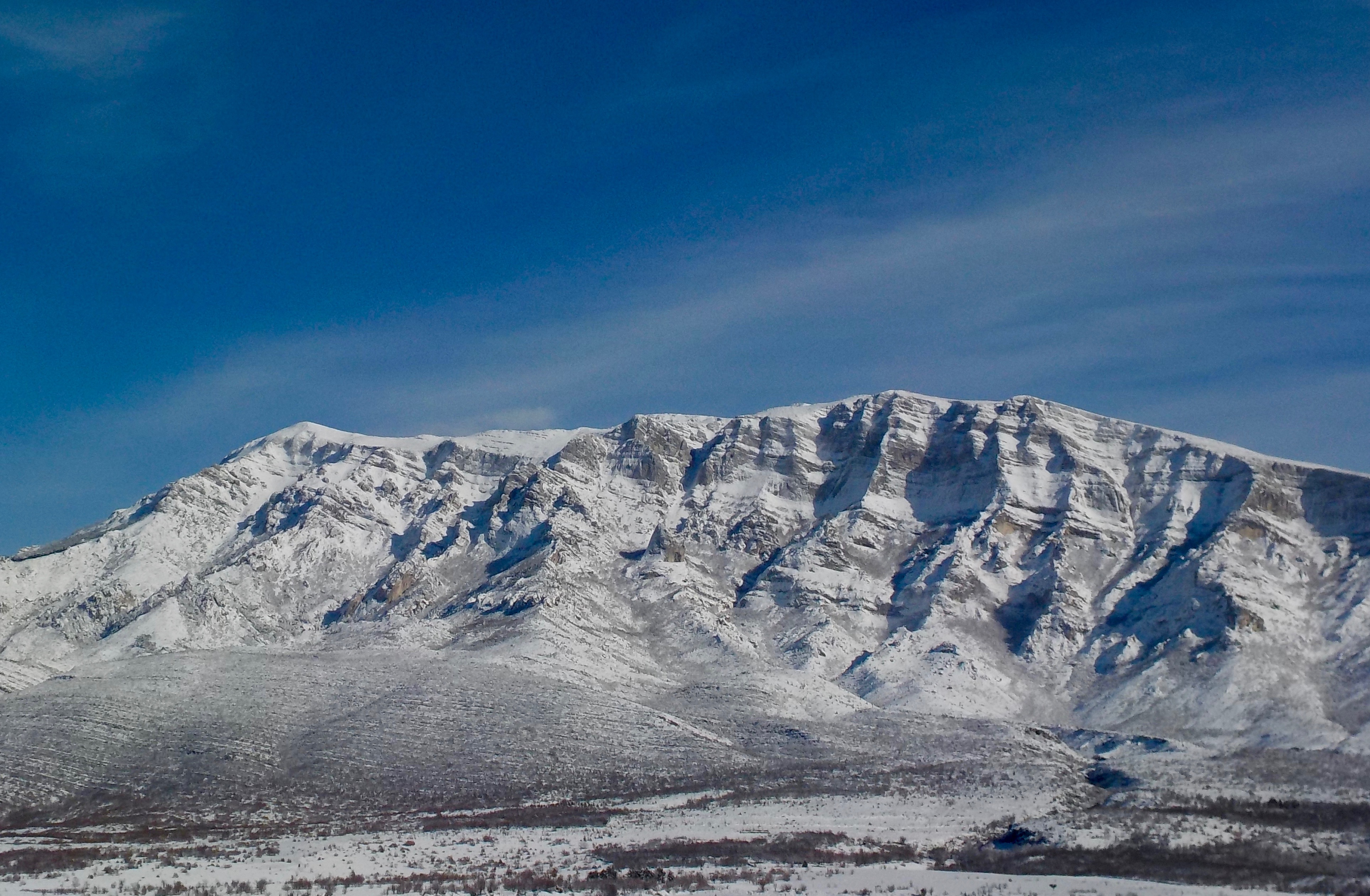
The central Dinara massif as viewed from Suho polje.

== Dinara Mountain ==
Sinjal, often marked as Dinara on maps, is the highest mountain in Croatia with an impressive south-western cliff, several hundred meters high, that is prominently visible from the Dalmatian plain below. It has a prominence of 728 m. This explains why the mountain Dinara, not being the highest in the range, still came to give its name to the whole range. In addition, the name is the origin to the name of one of the major mountain regions of Europe, the Dinaric Alps or Dinarides.

== Climate ==
Dinara is located only a few dozen kilometers away from the Adriatic Sea, and is part of the Dalmatian Hinterland, but the climate on Dinara is a much colder, mountain climate, making it one of the coldest places in Croatia with average temperatures between 2 and 4 °C at the peaks. The average precipitation is high, while the number of sunny hours per year ranges between 1,700 and 1,900.

There are no inhabited areas on the mountain itself and human presence consists mostly of small shacks that belong to the herdsmen from the nearby valleys such as that of the Cetina river.

== Tourism ==
One of the most fascinating massifs is on the southwestern slope. It is six kilometers long and up to 1,700 meters high, providing an interesting landscape for the travelers on the roads in the valley below to view. The massif does not attract many climbers, but its Ošljak peak (1,706 m) does.

== Flora and fauna ==
=== Flora ===
Native vegetation of the Dinara region comprises a large number of plant communities, or habitat types. According to the data available, in the area of the Dinara mountain there are around 750 plant species, of which more than 110 are strictly protected and 55 are endemics.

The flora consists of mountain grasslands, Scopoli's rockcress (Arabidopsis arenosa, Arabidopsis halleri and Arabidopsis croatica), Dinarian mouse-ear hawkweed (Hieracium pilosella), Dalmatian rockbell (Edraianthus dalmaticus), pasque flower (Pulsatilla), lion's paw (Leonotis leonurus), yellow gentian (Gentiana lutea), common juniper (Juniperus communis) and hairy azalea (Rhododendron).

=== Fauna ===
==== Birds ====
The Dinara region, particularly Dinara itself and the habitat around the Upper Cetina, from its source to the Peruća dam, is designated as a Special Protection Area (SPA) by the EU Directive on the Conservation of Wild Birds.

The bird species include: common pheasant Phasianus colchicus, common quail Coturnix coturnix, shore lark Eremophila alpestris, redshank Tringa totanus, stone curlew Burhinus oedicnemus, moustached warbler Acrocephalus melanopogon, golden eagle Aquila chrysaetos and short-toed snake eagle Circaetus gallicus. Also there is sighting of Eurasian griffon vulture Gyps fulvus probably on their flight over to Cres.

==== Mammals ====
The mammals of the Dinara region are: brown bear Ursus arctos, grey wolf Canis lupus, Eurasian lynx Lynx lynx, wildcat Felis silvestris, red fox Vulpes vulpes, wild boar Sus scrofa, Eurasian badger Meles meles, brown hare Lepus europaeus and balkan snow vole (Dolomys bogdanovi longipedis). Dinara is host to an endemic species of rodent, the balkan snow vole known in Croatian as the Dinarski miš ("Dinara mouse"). It is an endangered species.

==== Insects ====
The relatively well-preserved, extensive and diverse habitats of the Dinara and Svilaja mountains and the Upper Cetina provide a refuge to a number of invertebrate species whose natural habitats have been endangered due to specific living conditions they require, while many of them are endemics and placed on the Red List (certain species of caddisflies, dragonflies, stoneflies, orthoptera, etc.).

Invertebrates living in caves and holes make a special group – their biology remains relatively unknown, but they are protected as the cave fauna together with cave vertebrates.

Insects include: dalmatian ringlet Proterebia afra dalmata, rosalia longicorn, longhorn beetle, firebug, hornet, bumblebee, stag beetle and marsh fritillary.

==== Herpetology ====
The herpetofauna of the Dinara region comprises around 15 species of lizards, snakes and amphibians, some of which are endangered, mostly because their natural habitats have been either reduced in extent or suffered degradation.

The herpetofauna comprises: smooth snake, balkan whip snake, nose-horned viper, fire salamander, slow worm, karst meadow viper and alpine newt.

== Gallery ==
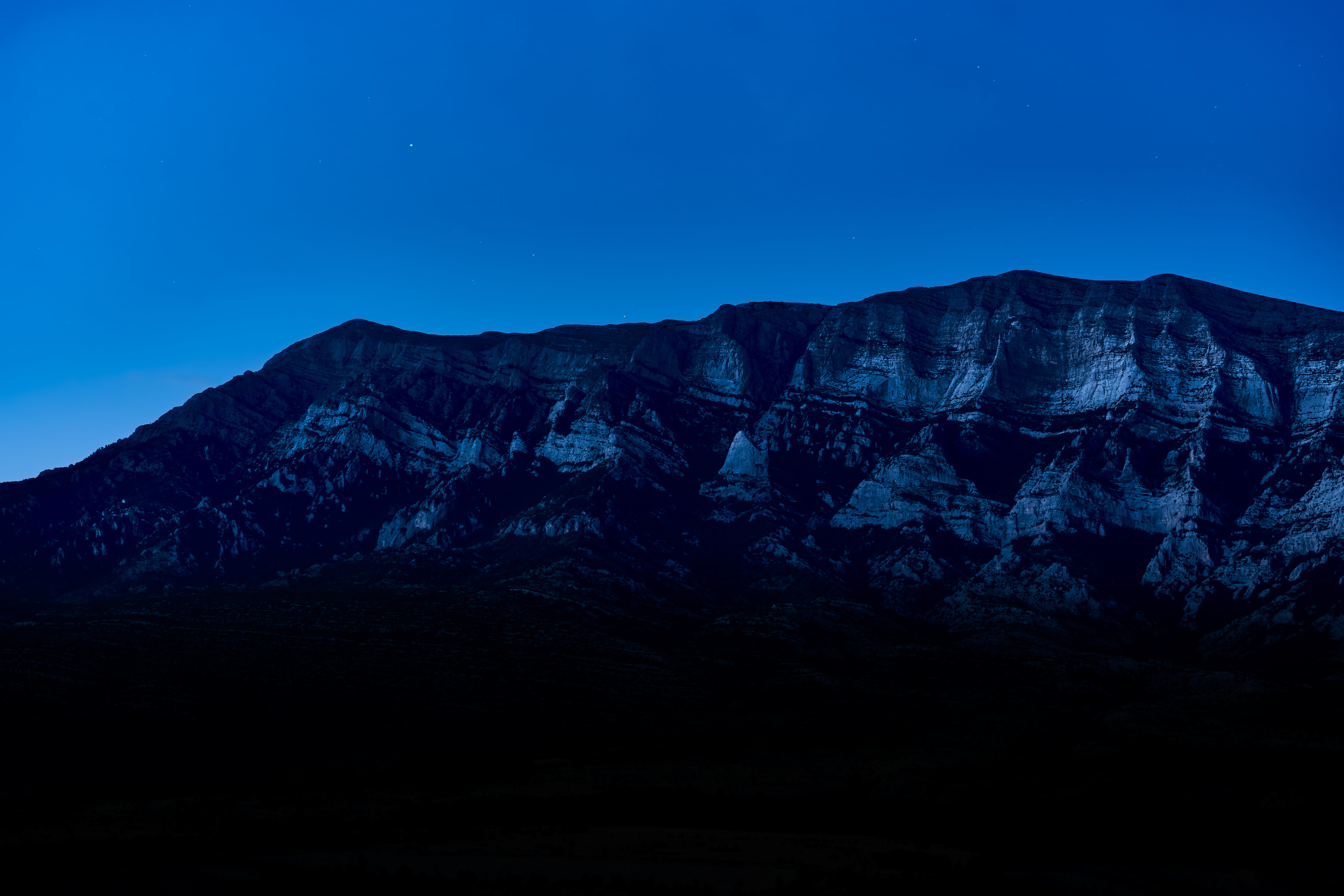
Dinara at night from Kijevo

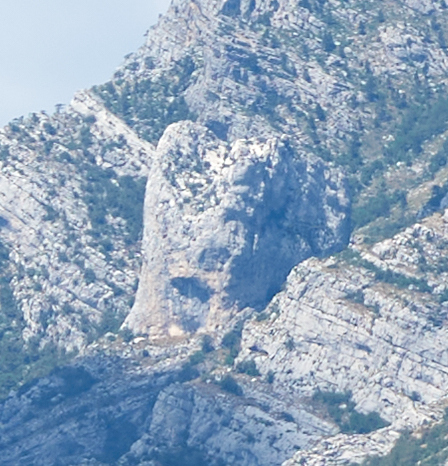
Tooth (Serbo-Croatian: Zub) formation

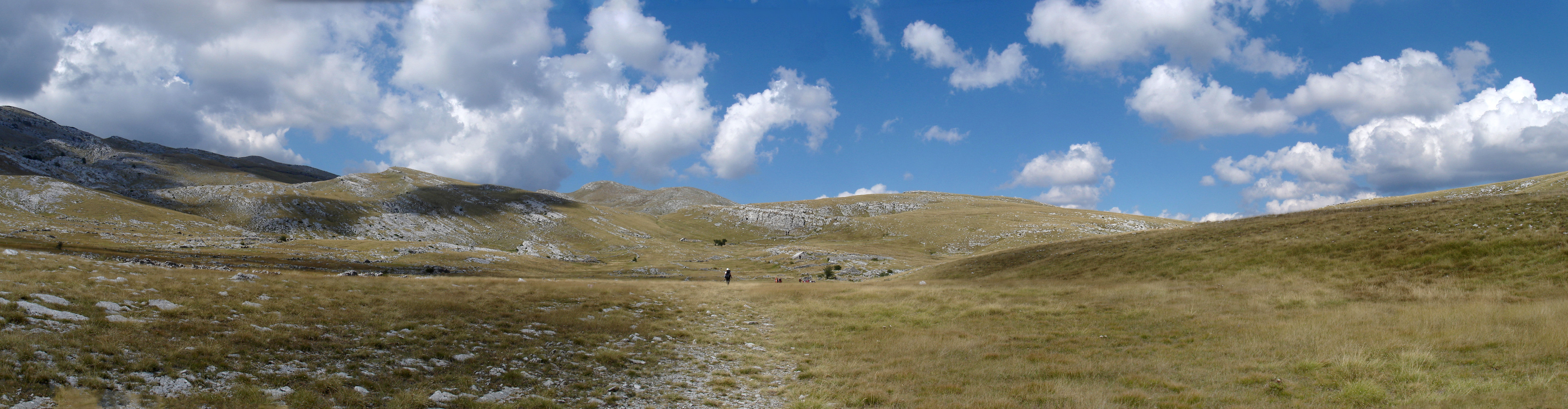
Start of the trail near Glavaš

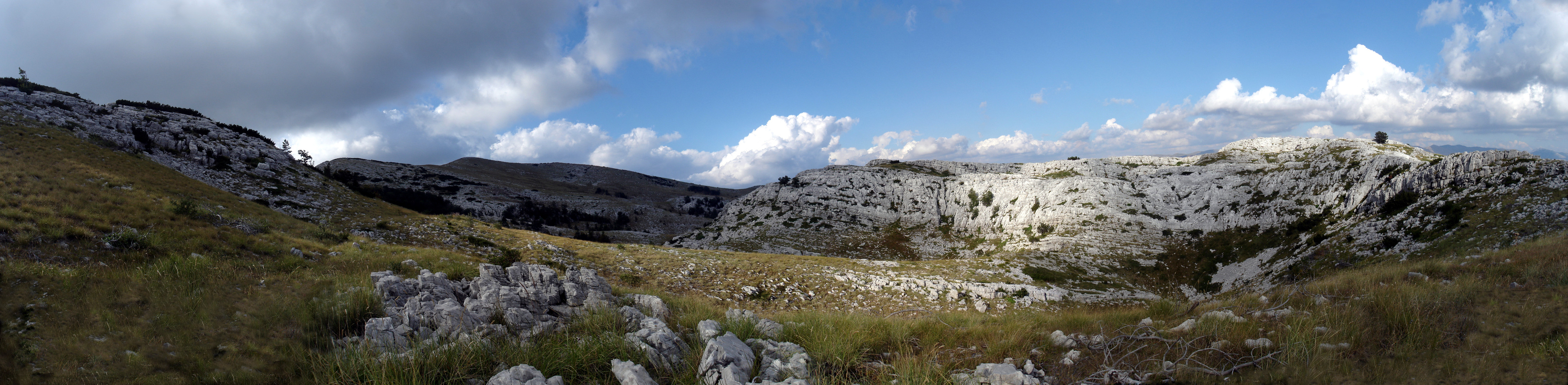
Dinara heights

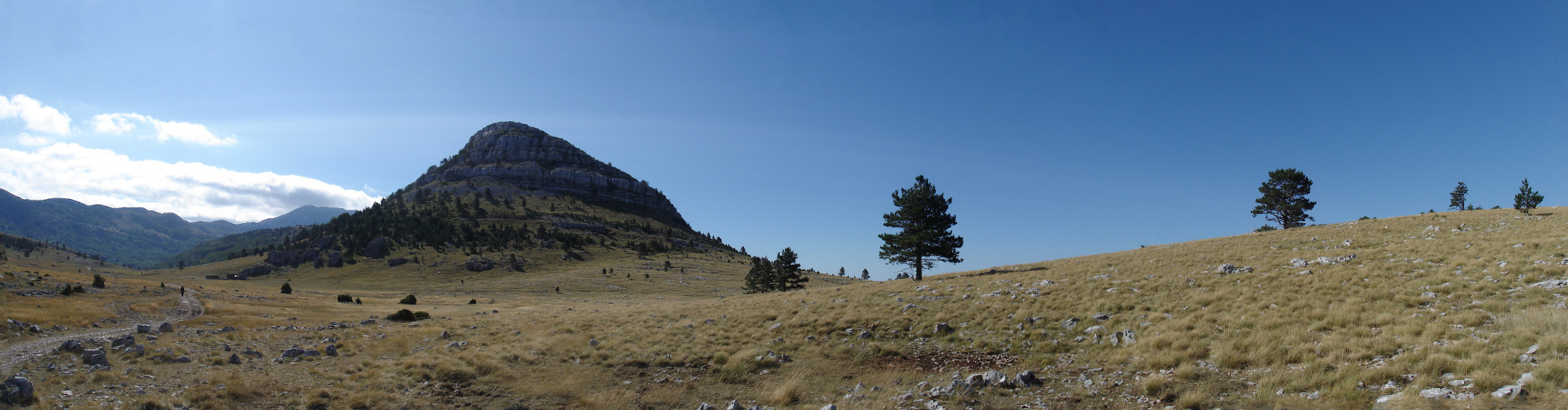
Vistas on the road leading to Brezovac mountain lodge

== See also ==
- List of mountains in Croatia
- List of mountains in Bosnia and Herzegovina
- List of protected areas of Croatia

== General sources ==
- Ostroški, Ljiljana, ed. (December 2015). Statistički ljetopis Republike Hrvatske 2015 [Statistical Yearbook of the Republic of Croatia 2015] (PDF). Statistical Yearbook of the Republic of Croatia (in Croatian and English). Vol. 47. Zagreb: Croatian Bureau of Statistics. ISSN 1333-3305.

== Bibliography ==
=== Alpinism ===
- Poljak, Željko (February 1959). "Dinara i Troglav". Kazalo za "Hrvatski planinar" i "Naše planine" 1898—1958 (PDF). Vol. XI. p. 19. ISSN 0354-0650.

=== Biology ===
- Šašić, Martina; Nahirnić, Ana; Tarmann, Gerhard M. (2016-12-31). "Zygaenidae (Lepidoptera) in the Lepidoptera collections of the Croatian Natural History Museum". Natura Croatica: Periodicum Musei Historiae Naturalis Croatici. 25 (2): 233–248. doi:10.20302/NC.2016.25.19. eISSN 1848-7386.
