= List of mountains in Bosnia and Herzegovina =

List of mountains in Bosnia and Herzegovina:

| Mountain | Peak name | Elevation | Municipality | Coordinates |
|---|---|---|---|---|
| Maglić | Maglić | 2386 m 7,828 ft | Foča | 43°16′52″N 18°44′00″E |
| Volujak | Volujak | 2337 m 7,667 ft | Gacko | 43°13′55″N 18°43′01″E |
| Čvrsnica | Pločno | 2228 m 7,310 ft | Posušje | 43°35′56″N 17°33′52″E |
| Ljubišnja | Kota 2190 (Dernečište 2.238m in Montenegro) | 2190 m 7,185 ft | Foča | |
| Prenj | Zelena glava | 2115 m 6,939 ft | Mostar | 43°32′05″N 17°54′15″E |
| Vranica | Nadkrstac | 2110 m 6,923 ft | Gornji Vakuf-Uskoplje | 43°57′24″N 17°43′00″E |
| Treskavica | Mala Ćaba (or Đokin Toranj) | 2086 m 6,844 ft | Trnovo | 43°35′46″N 18°20′49″E |
| Vran | Veliki Vran | 2074 m 6,804 ft | Tomislavgrad | 43°40′05″N 17°30′20″E |
| Bjelašnica | Bjelašnica (local name Opservatorij) | 2067 m 6,781 ft | Trnovo | |
| Lelija | Velika Lelija | 2032 m 6,667 ft | Kalinovik | |
| Zelengora | Bregoč | 2014 m 6,608 ft | Foča | |
| Cincar | Cincar | 2006 m 6,581 ft | Glamoč | |
| Visočica | Džamija | 1974 m 6,476 ft | Konjic | |
| Velež | Botin | 1969 m 6,460 ft | Mostar | |
| Klekovača | | 1962 m 6,437 ft | Drvar | |
| Raduša | | 1956 m 6,417 ft | Prozor-Rama | |
| Vlašić | Paljenik (or Opaljenik) | 1933 m 6,342 ft | Travnik | |
| Crvanj | | 1921 m 6,302 ft | Nevesinje | |
| Jahorina | Ogorjelica | 1916 m 6,286 ft | Pale | 43°41′35″N 18°36′51″E |
| Dinara | | 1913 m 6,276 ft | Livno | |
| Vitorog | | 1907 m 6,257 ft | Glamoč | |
| Orjen | | 1895 m 6,217 ft | Trebinje | |
| Velika Golija | | 1890 m 6,201 ft | Livno | |
| Šator | | 1873 m 6,145 ft | Bosansko Grahovo | |
| Trebova | | 1872 m 6,142 ft | Foča | |
| Kamešnica | | 1856 m 6,089 ft | Livno | |
| Lovnica | | 1856 m 6,089 ft | Konjic | |
| Lebršnik | Mesni Štit (Orlovac 1985m in Montenegro) | 1847 m 6,060 ft | Gacko | |
| Zec Planina | | 1845 m 6,053 ft | Fojnica | |
| Malovan | | 1826 m 5,991 ft | Kupres | |
| Osječanica | | 1798 m 5,899 ft | Bosanski Petrovac | |
| Ljubuša | | 1797 m 5,896 ft | Tomislavgrad | |
| Čabulja | | 1786 m 5,860 ft | Mostar | |
| Šćit | | 1781 m 5,843 ft | Kiseljak | |
| Plazenica | | 1765 m 5,791 ft | Kupres | |
| Stožer | | 1758 m 5,768 ft | Kupres | |
| Borovac | | 1749 m 5,738 ft | Goražde | |
| Slovinj | | 1743 m 5,719 ft | Glamoč | |
| Baba | | 1735 m 5,692 ft | Gacko | |
| Lunjevača | | 1707 m 5,600 ft | Drvar | |
| Bitovnja | | 1700 m 5,577 ft | Kreševo | |
| Tušnica | | 1697 m 5,568 ft | Livno | |
| Živanj | | 1696 m 5,564 ft | Gacko | |
| Zvijezda | | 1673 m 5,489 ft | Višegrad | 43°54′50″N 19°17′08″E |
| Kruščićka planina | | 1673 m 5,489 ft | Vitez | |
| Jadovnik Lisina | | 1656 m 5,433 ft | Drvar | |
| Veliko Rujište | | 1656 m 5,433 ft | Mostar | |
| Ujilica | | 1654 m 5,427 ft | Grahovo | |
| Romanija | Veliki Lupoglav | 1652 m 5,420 ft | Pale | |
| Kapić | | 1644 m 5,394 ft | Gacko | |
| Staretina | | 1633 m 5,358 ft | Livno | |
| Trebević | Sofe | 1627 m 5,338 ft | Istočno Sarajevo | |
| Grmeč | Crni vrh (Black peak) | 1605 m 5,266 ft | Bosanski Petrovac | |
| Mjedena Glava | | 1602 m 5,256 ft | Gacko | |
| Ravašnica | | 1565 m 5,135 ft | Kupres | |
| Javor | | 1553 m 5,095 ft | Nevesinje | |
| Hrbljina | | 1543 m 5,062 ft | Glamoč | |
| Vijenac | | 1539 m 5,049 ft | Bosansko Grahovo | |
| Javor | Žep | 1537 m 5,043 ft | Han Pijesak-Kladanj | |
| Ivan planina | | 1534 m 5,033 ft | Konjic | |
| Kovač planina | | 1532 m 5,026 ft | Čajniče | |
| Bačina planina | | 1530 m 5,020 ft | Prozor | |
| Žepska planina | | 1517 m 4,977 ft | Rogatica | |
| Komar | | 1510 m 4,954 ft | Bugojno | |
| Igman | Crni vrh (Black peak) | 1504 m 4,934 ft | Ilidža | |
| Kmur | | 1508 m 4,948 ft | Foča | |
| Dimitor | | 1483 m 4,865 ft | Mrkonjić Grad | 44°24′30″N 16°55′16″E |
| Zvijezda | | 1349 m 4,426 ft | Vareš | |
| Čemernica | | 1338 m 4,390 ft | Banja Luka | 44°31′00″N 17°13′41″E |
| Konjuh | | 1328 m 4,357 ft | Banovići | 44°18′06″N 18°32′46″E |
| Bokševica | | 1315 m 4,314 ft | Jablanica | 43°43′30″N 17°46′10″E |
| Manjača | | 1239 m 4,065 ft | Banja Luka | 44°34′04″N 17°03′24″E |
| Kozara | Lisina | 977 m 3,205 ft | Prijedor | 44°58′15″N 16°58′39″E |
| Motajica | Gradina | 652 m 2,139 ft | Srbac | 45°05′34″N 17°39′46″E |
