= Žep =

Coordinates: 44°04′N 19°02′E

Žep (Serbian Cyrillic: Жеп) is the highest peak on the Javor mountain in the municipality of Han Pijesak, Bosnia and Herzegovina. It has an altitude of 1,537 metres (5,043 ft).

== See also ==
- List of mountains in Bosnia and Herzegovina
