= Jadovnik Lisina =

Mountain in Bosnia and Herzegovina

Jadovnik
- Location within Bosnia and Herzegovina

Highest point
- Elevation: 1,656 metres (5,433 ft)
- Coordinates: 44°16′52″N 16°26′03″E

Geography
- Location: Bosnia and Herzegovina

Jadovnik (Cyrillic: Јадовник) is a mountain in the municipality of Drvar, Bosnia and Herzegovina. It has an altitude of 1,656 metres (5,433 ft).

== See also ==
- List of mountains in Bosnia and Herzegovina
