= Šćit =

Coordinates: 44.0205°N 17.7894°E

Šćit is a mountain in the municipality of Kiseljak, Bosnia and Herzegovina. It has an altitude of 1,781 metres (5,843 ft).

== See also ==
- List of mountains in Bosnia and Herzegovina
