= Bitovnja =

Coordinates: 43°48′N 17°57′E

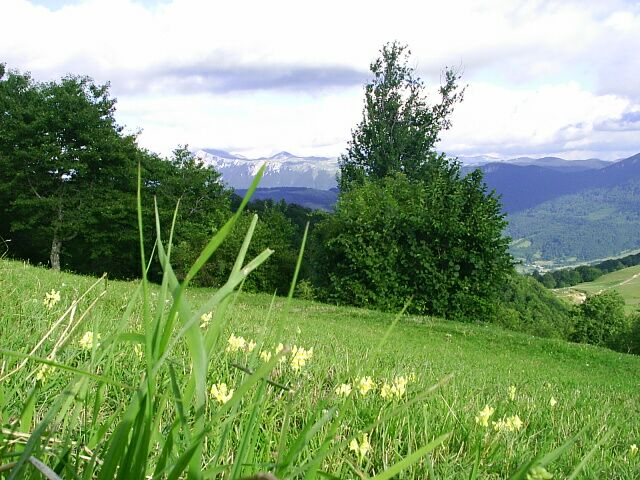
Bitovnja mountains in Bosnia and Herzegovina

Bitovnja is a mountain in the municipality of Kreševo, Bosnia and Herzegovina. It has an altitude of 1,700 metres (5,600 ft).

== See also ==
- List of mountains in Bosnia and Herzegovina

== Bibliography ==
- Guber, Mihovil (1943). "Pustošenje planinarskih objekata u južnoj Hrvatskoj" [The Desolation of Mountain Objects in Southern Croatia] (PDF). Hrvatski planinar (in Croatian). Vol. 39, no. 6–7. pp. 85–93. ISSN 0354-0650.
