= Kamešnica (mountain) =

Mountain in Croatia and Bosnia and Herzegovina

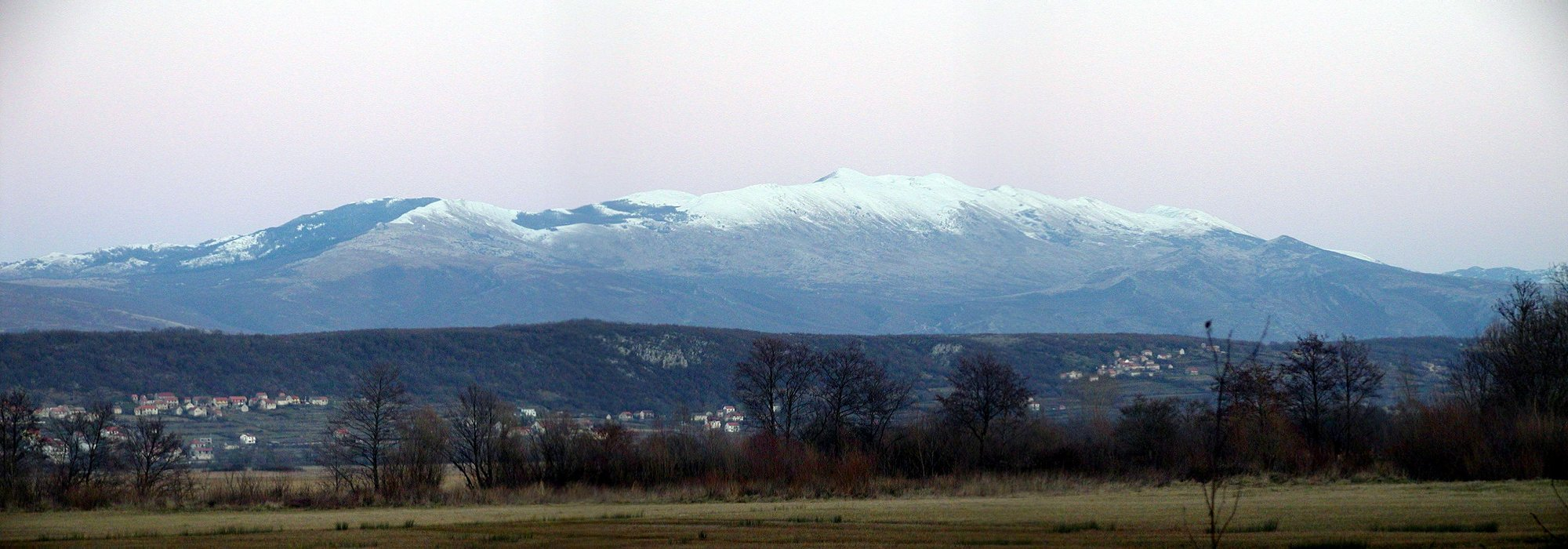
- Kamešnica under snow

Highest point
- Elevation: 1,855 m (6,086 ft)
- Coordinates: 43°43′20.77″N 16°51′45.35″E

Geography
- Location within Croatia Location within Bosnia and Herzegovina
- Location: Dalmatia, Croatia; Canton 10, Bosnia and Herzegovina
- Parent range: Dinaric Alps

Kamešnica is a mountain in the Dinaric Alps, located in the southern end of the Dinara Mountain Range on the border between Bosnia and Herzegovina (Canton 10) and Croatia (Dalmatia). It is 1,851 metres (6,073 ft) high and stretches from the northwest white road pass Vaganj (1,173 m) to the Buško Blato artificial lake. The tallest peak is Konj (Horse) 1,855 metres (6,086 ft), which is located in Bosnia and Herzegovina and offers views of both sides of the border. In clear weather, it is possible to see the most remote areas of the Adriatic Sea and its islands. The vicinity's many trails and caves make it popular with hikers.

== Ecosystem ==
Kamešnica is a favorable habitat for many species of plants and animals. The ecosystem of the northern parts of the mountain has been completely preserved due to its isolated location and the thick forest that surrounds it.

== Climate ==
Most of Kamešnica's peaks are covered by snow for six to seven months of the year.

Most of Kamešnica has a climate characterized by its position in two main climate regions; continental (northern side which is surrounded by Livanjsko field, 700 m above sea-level with mean annual temperature of 9 °C) and submediterranean (southern side which is surrounded by Sinjsko field, 300 m above sea-level where the mean annual temperature is 12.5 °C). Only the highest parts of Kamešnica (above 1300 m), have a snowy-forested climate.

The weather and the mean annual air temperature can be compared using data of Zavizan metro station (1594 m). The lowest temperature on Kamešnica during the winter approximately measures -20 °C. Mean annual quantity of precipitation on Kamešnica ranges from 1200 mm to 2500 mm (maximum quantity on the peaks Konj, Kurljaj, Burnjaca and Gareta). In general, the climate of Kamešnica is very similar to the climate of Velebit.

The "Bura" is a dry and cold wind that blows from the northeast (from continent towards sea). While the bura is blowing, the peaks of Kamešnica are in the cloud called "Cap".

In February 2021, the mountain was declared as the 12th Croatia's Nature Park.

== Mountain huts ==
In the 1935–1936 season, the Sklonište prof. Giromette mountain hut, at 1,500 metres (4,900 ft) in elevation, saw 593 visitors, including 29 Czechoslovak, 12 Italian and 6 German citizens. The mountain hut on Vaganj at 1,261 metres (4,137 ft) saw 152 visitors, including 2 Czechoslovak citizens In the 1936–1937 season, Sklonište prof. Giromette saw 473 visitors, including 2 Czechoslovak and 2 French citizens; that on Vaganj saw 530 visitors, including 5 Austrian, 5 German, 4 Czechoslovak and 2 French citizens. In the 1937–1938 season the Sklonište prof. Giromette saw 234 visitors, including 5 Czechoslovak and 3 Italian citizens; the mountain hut on Vaganj saw 650 visitors, including 21 Italian and 15 Czechoslovak citizens.

== See also ==
- List of mountains in Croatia
- List of mountains in Bosnia and Herzegovina
- Sinj
- Livno
- Dinaric Alps
- Massacre of villages under Kamešnica

== Bibliography ==
- Poljak, Željko (February 1959). "Kamešnica". Kazalo za "Hrvatski planinar" i "Naše planine" 1898—1958 (PDF). Naše planine (in Croatian). Vol. XI. p. 19. ISSN 0354-0650.
