= Lisina (Raška) =

- Village (Selo)
- Interactive map of Lisina
- Coordinates: 43°16′57″N 20°45′02″E
- Country: Serbia
- District: Raška District
- Municipality: Raška

Population (2002)
  - Total: 52
- Time zone: UTC+1 (CET)
  - Summer (DST): UTC+2 (CEST)

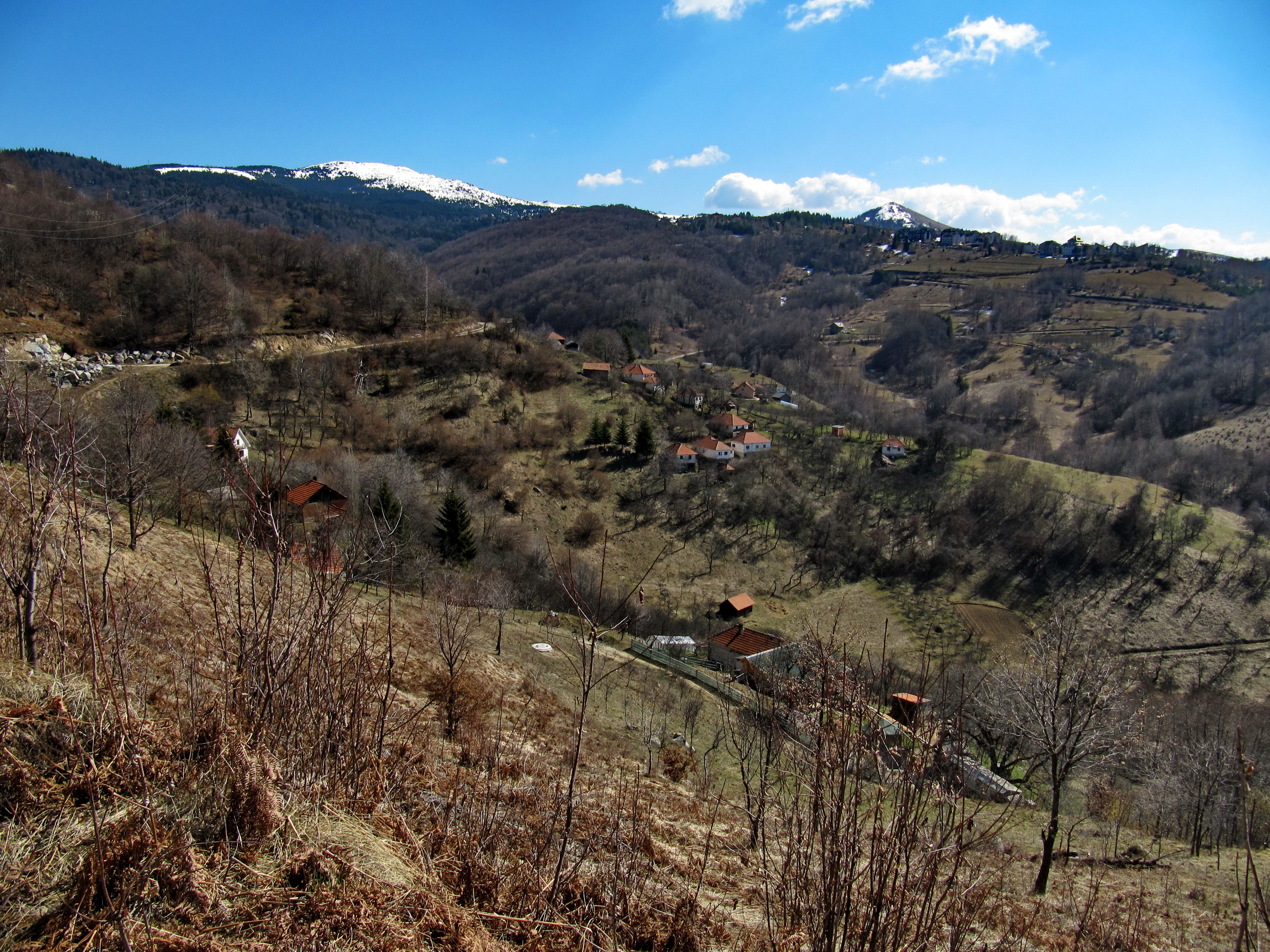
Lisina, Serbia

Lisina is a village in the municipality of Raška, Serbia, with 52 people as of the 2002 census.
