= Motajica =

- Мотајица
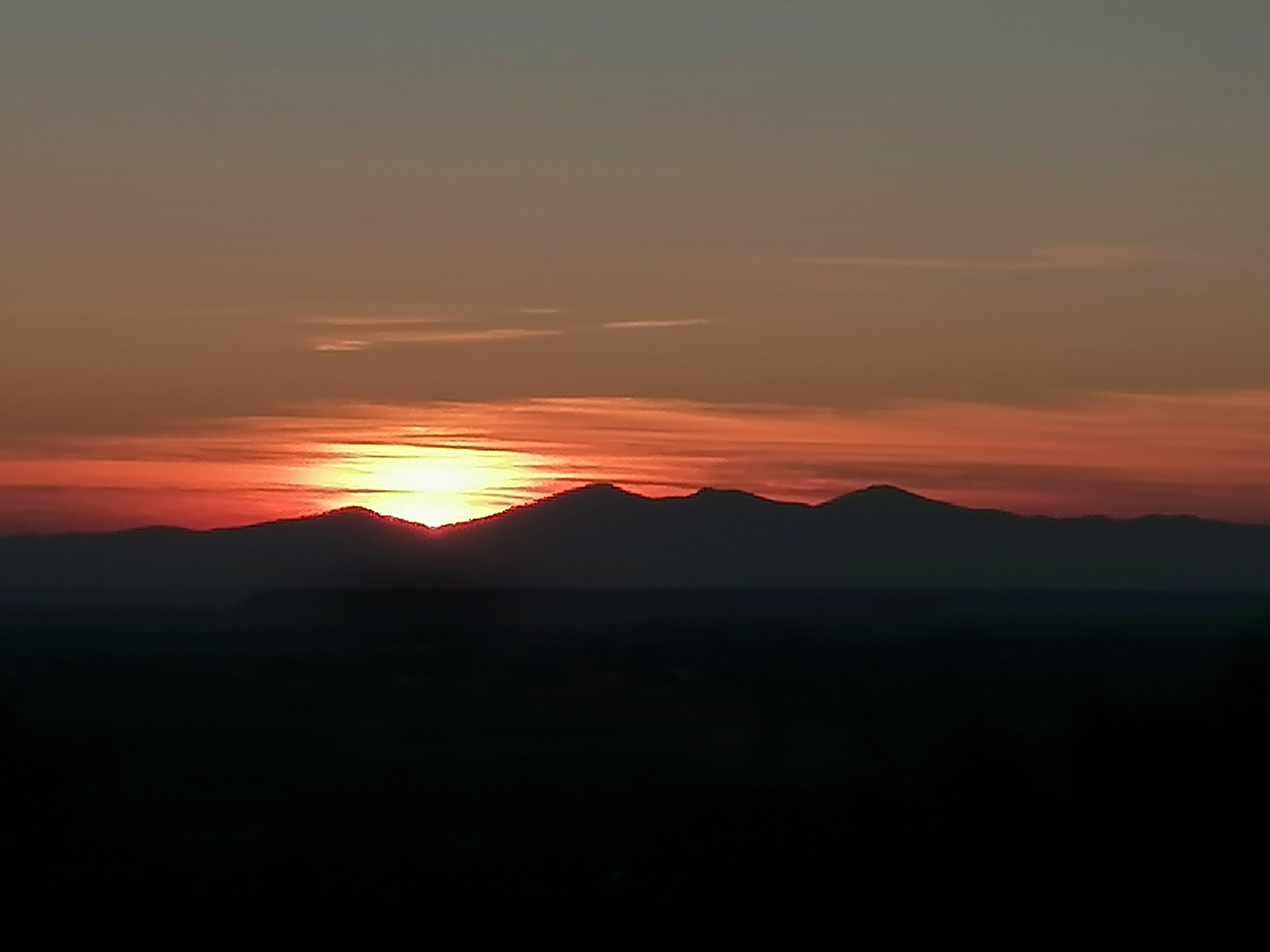
- Motajica Mountain, view from the Gromačnik, near Slavonski Brod

Highest point
- Peak: Gradina
- Elevation: 652 m (2,139 ft)
- Coordinates: 45°05′34″N 17°39′46″E

Geography
- Location within Bosnia and Herzegovina
- Location: Republika Srpska, Bosnia and Herzegovina
- Parent range: Pannonian island mountains

Motajica is a mountain of Bosnia and Herzegovina. It is a mountain island, because a few thousand years ago, when it was the Pannonian Sea, it and several other mountains in the Pannonian region were the islands.

== See also ==
- List of mountains in Bosnia and Herzegovina
