= Líšina =

- Municipality
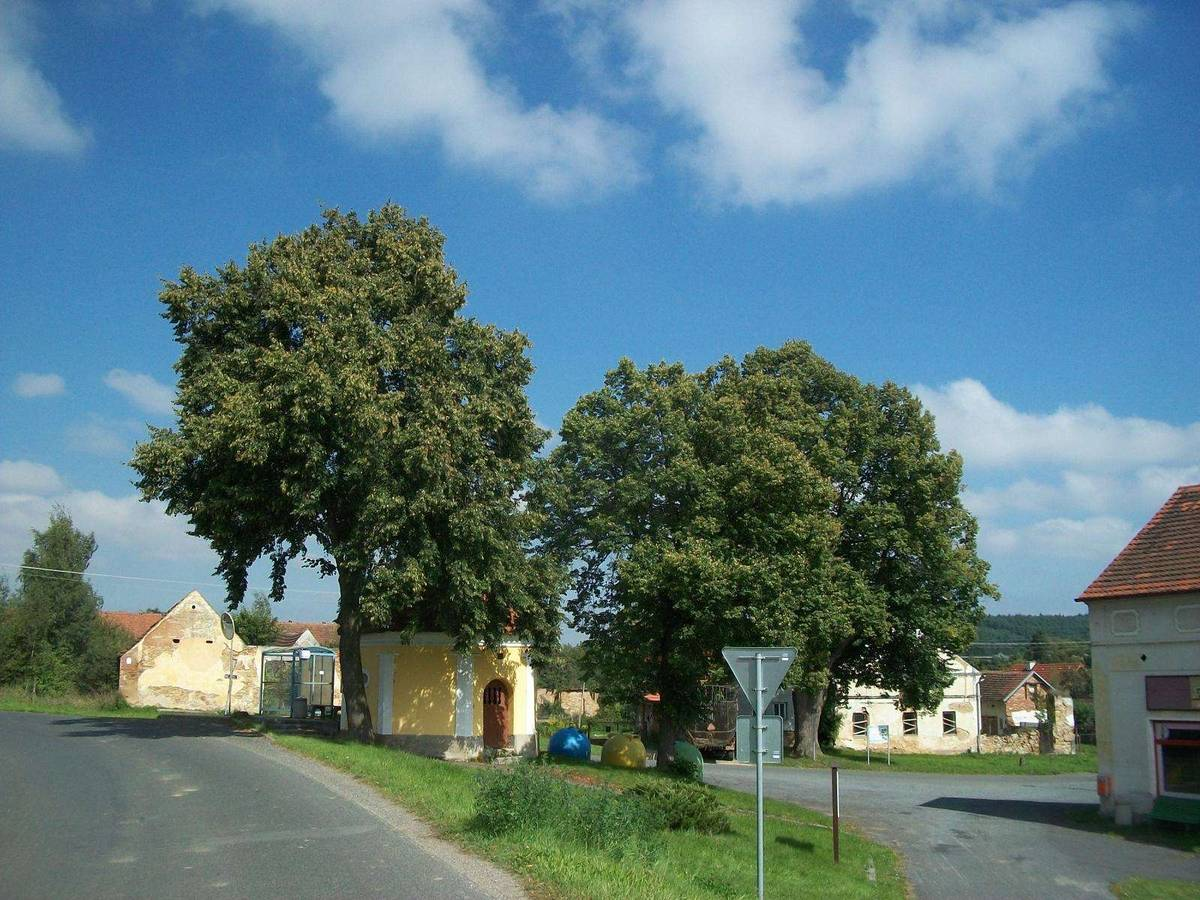
- Chapel of Exaltation of the Holy Cross

- Location in the Czech Republic
- Coordinates: 49°36′13″N 13°9′53″E
- Country: Czech Republic
- Region: Plzeň
- District: Plzeň-South
- First mentioned: 1180

Area
  - Total: 7.99 km^{2} (3.08 sq mi)
- Elevation: 358 m (1,175 ft)

Population (2026-01-01)
  - Total: 154
  - Density: 19.3/km^{2} (49.9/sq mi)
- Time zone: UTC+1 (CET)
  - Summer (DST): UTC+2 (CEST)
- Postal code: 333 01
- Website: lisina.cz

Líšina is a municipality and village in Plzeň-South District in the Plzeň Region of the Czech Republic. It has about 200 inhabitants.

Líšina lies approximately 23 kilometres (14 mi) south-west of Plzeň and 106 km (66 mi) south-west of Prague.

== Demographics ==
Historical population
Year	Pop.	±%
1869	331	—
1880	321	−3.0%
1890	332	+3.4%
1900	356	+7.2%
1910	367	+3.1%
1921	359	−2.2%
1930	399	+11.1%
1950	255	−36.1%
1961	224	−12.2%
1970	199	−11.2%
1980	206	+3.5%
1991	167	−18.9%
2001	152	−9.0%
2011	159	+4.6%
2021	154	−3.1%
Source: Censuses
