= Stožer =

Mountain in Kupres, Bosnia and Herzegovina

Coordinates: 43°58′N 17°20′E

Stožer is a mountain in the municipality of Kupres, Bosnia and Herzegovina. It has an altitude of 1,758 metres (5,768 ft).

== See also ==
- List of mountains in Bosnia and Herzegovina
