= Kmur =

Mountain in Foča, Bosnia and Herzegovina

Coordinates: 43°28′N 18°43′E

- Кмур
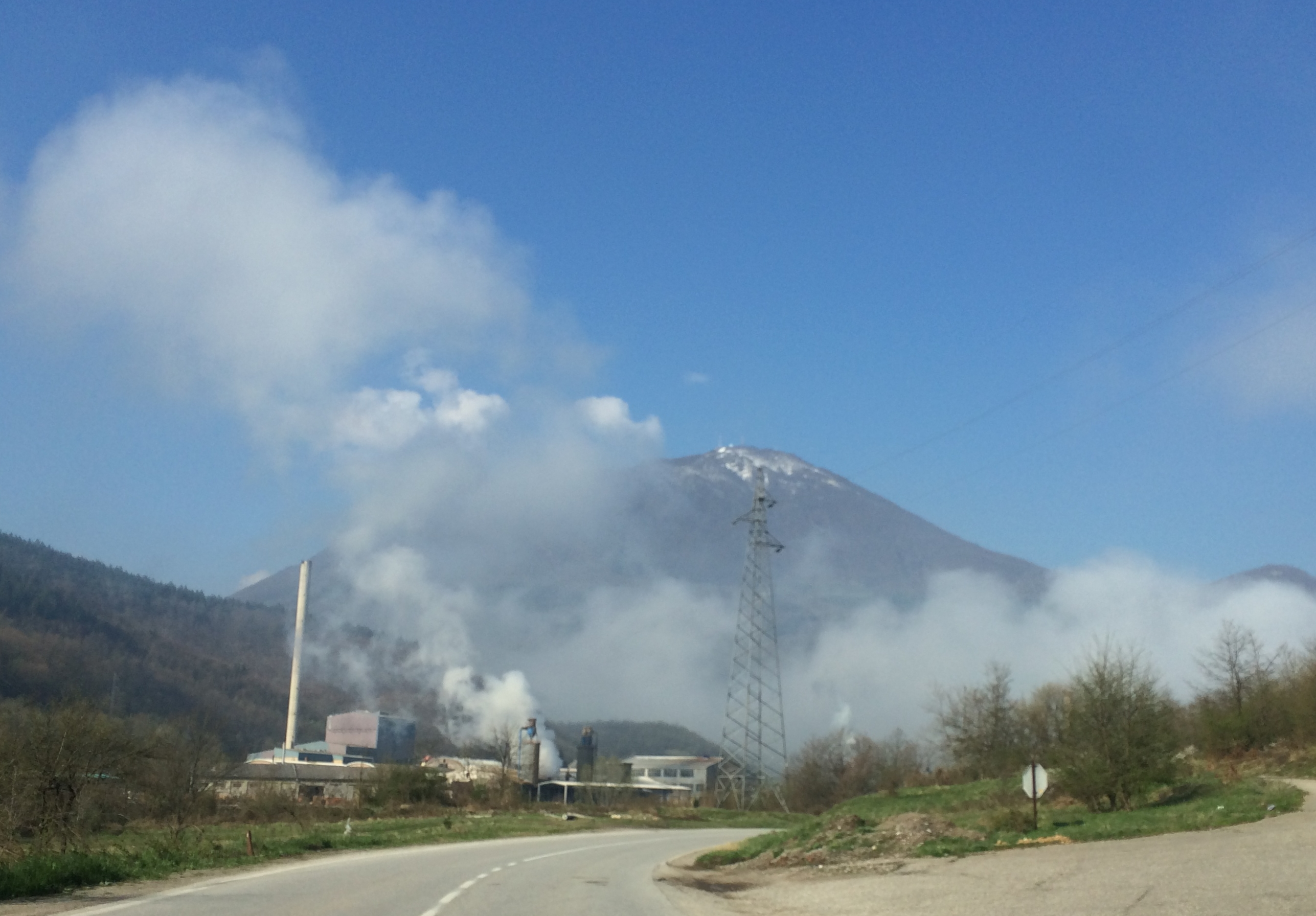

Highest point
- Elevation: 1,508 m (4,948 ft)

Geography
- Location: Bosnia and Herzegovina
- Parent range: Dinaric Alps

Kmur (Serbian Cyrillic: Кмур) is a mountain in the municipality of Foča, Bosnia and Herzegovina. It has an altitude of 1,508 metres (4,948 ft).

== See also ==
- List of mountains in Bosnia and Herzegovina
