= Ujilica =

Coordinates: 44°16′N 16°16′E

Ujilica (Serbian Cyrillic: Ујилица) is a mountain in the municipality of Grahovo, Bosnia and Herzegovina. It has an altitude of 1,654 metres (5,427 ft). It is the northernmost part of the Dinara Mountain Range

== See also ==
- List of mountains in Bosnia and Herzegovina
