= Pod, Bosnia and Herzegovina =

Archaeological site in Bosnia and Herzegovina

Pod
- Gradina Pod
- Location within Bosnia and Herzegovina
- 44°03′14″N 17°25′26″E
- Type: Hillfort
- Periods: Bronze Age, Iron Age
- Location: near Bugojno
- Region: Bosnia and Herzegovina

Pod is an archeological site in the municipality of Bugojno, Bosnia and Herzegovina. It is a prehistoric settlement and hill fort located about 40 metres (130 ft) above the bed of the river Poričnica, a tributary of the Vrbas, on a slope of Mountain Koprivnica above the main road leading from Bugojno to Gornji Vakuf, in the settlement of Čipuljić, today an integral part of Bugojno.

== History ==
The fortified site was first inhabited in the early Bronze Age and even eneolithic (2500 to 1700 BC). After the Bronze Age it was uninhabited for four centuries, until repopulated in the early Iron Age (~700 BC) till the turn of the 4th and 3rd centuries BCE.

== Significance ==
Stratified materials from Pod defined Central Bosnian cultural group of the late Bronze Age. Pod has been declared a National Monument of Bosnia and Herzegovina.

== Excavations ==
Archaeological excavation was undertaken there led by Branka Raunig in 1973.
