= Stražbenice =

- Village
- Location within Bosnia and Herzegovina
- Coordinates: 43°44′N 19°17′E
- Country: Bosnia and Herzegovina
- Entity: Republika Srpska
- Municipality: Višegrad
- Time zone: UTC+1 (CET)
  - Summer (DST): UTC+2 (CEST)

Stražbenice (Serbian: Стражбенице) is a village in the municipality of Višegrad, Bosnia and Herzegovina. Stražbenice was founded in the late 13th century by two brothers and slavic nobles, Milan and Dragutin Stražben.
