= Kapić =

Kapić or Kapič is a Croatian, Bosnian and Slovenian surname. Notable people with the surname include:

- Ambroz Antun Kapić (1529–1598), Croatian Archbishop
- Adem Kapič (born 1975), Slovenian footballer
- Bekim Kapić (born 1979), Slovenian footballer
- Rifet Kapić (born 1995), Bosnian footballer
- Virginia Kapić (born 1978), Croato-Dutch political activist

== See also ==
- Kapići, a village in Bosnia and Herzegovina
