= Underground base =

An underground base is a subterranean facility used for military or scientific purposes.

Examples are:

- Cheyenne Mountain Complex
- Chiashan Air Force Base
- Iranian underground missile bases
- Raven Rock Mountain Complex
- Željava Air Base

There may be more than 10,000 underground military facilities worldwide.

== See also ==
- Underground living
