= Vranica =

Mountain range in Bosnia and Herzegovina

- Враница
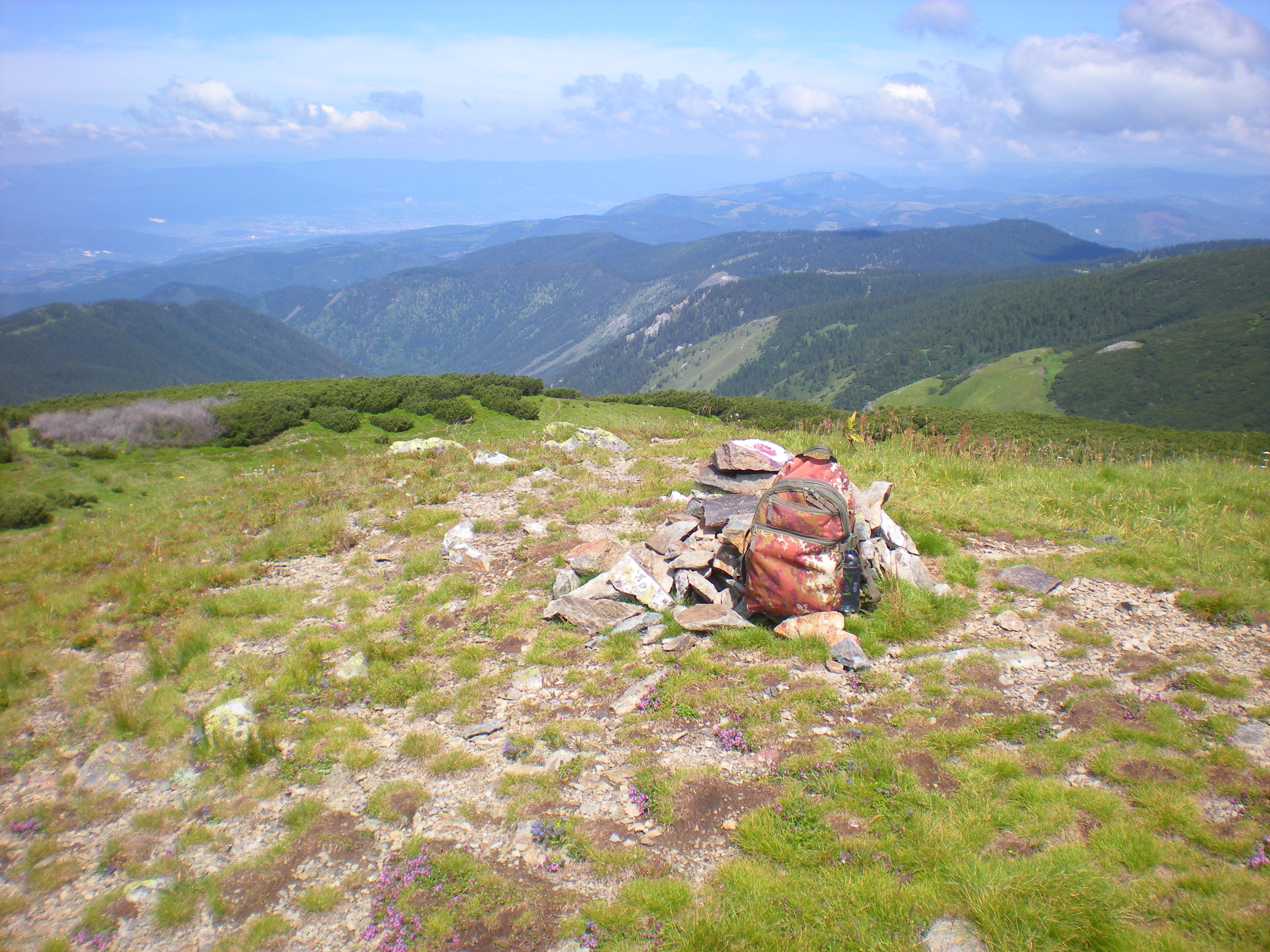
- Vranica, Nadkrstac, summit view

Highest point
- Elevation: 2,110 m (6,920 ft)
- Coordinates: 43°57′24″N 17°43′00″E

Geography
- Location within Bosnia and Herzegovina
- Location: Bosnia and Herzegovina

Vranica (Serbian Cyrillic: Враница) is a mountain range in the Dinaric Alps of central Bosnia and Herzegovina, located between the town of Gornji Vakuf in the west and the town of Fojnica in the east, within the territory of the Federation. The highest peak is Nadkrstac at 2,110 metres (6,920 ft). Geologically, the Vranica range is part of the Dinaric Alps and formed largely of secondary and tertiary sedimentary rock, mostly limestone. Notable peaks are Nadkrstac (2110 m), Locika (2106 m), Rosinj (2059 m) and Scit (1949 m). Thick shrubs of Pinus Mugo replace mixed forest—mostly beech—above 1,400 m (4,600 ft). The typical karst characteristics of the nearby Herzegovina mountains is relatively absent in Vranica, which has relatively abundant water sources. Streams that source from these mountains are the Dragača in the east, the Vrbas in the west.

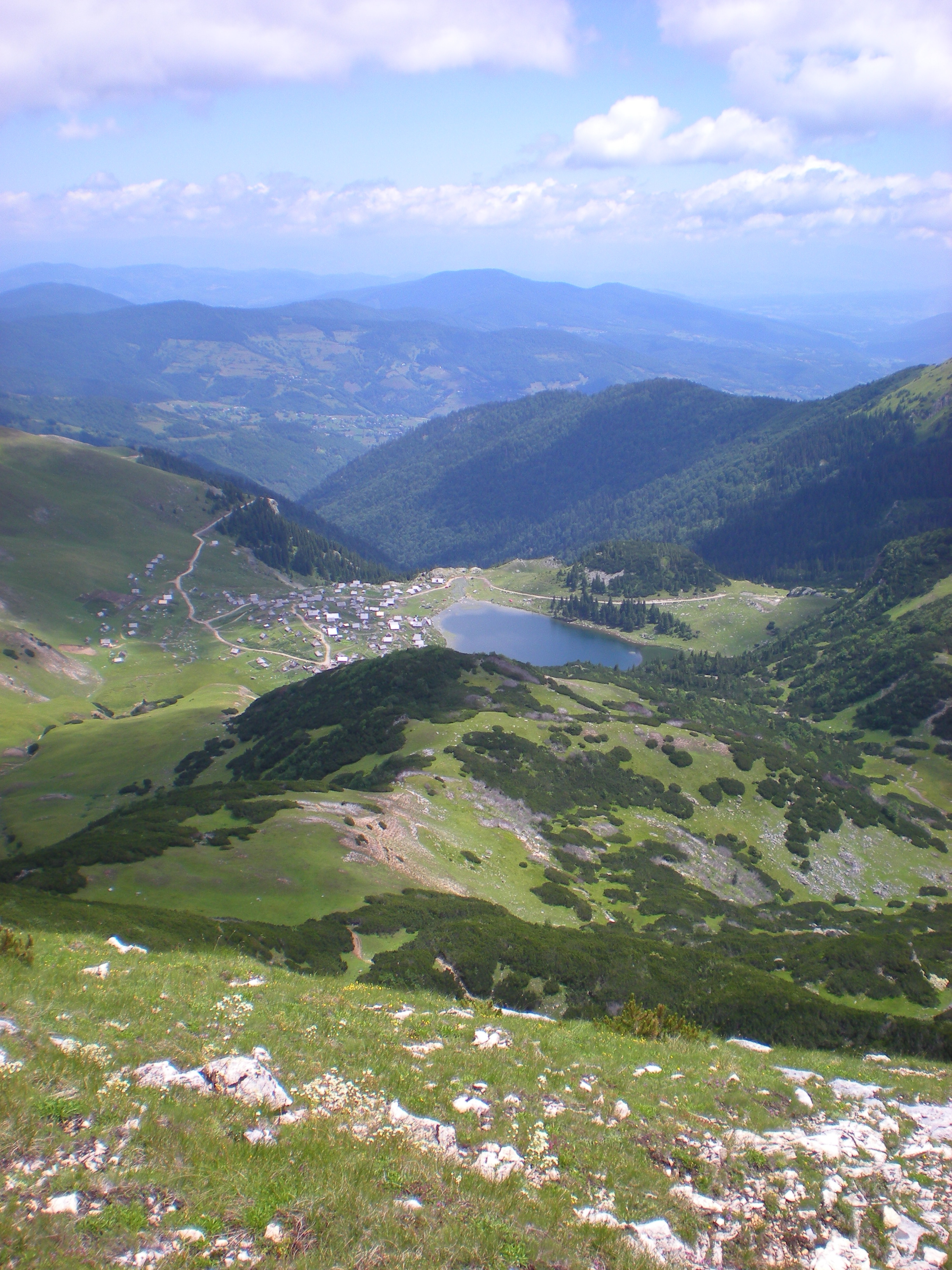
Prokoško Jezero as seen from the Vranica main ridge. Bosnia-Herzegovina.

== Prokoško Lake ==
Just east of its main summit, at 1660 m altitude is a beautiful glacial lake called Prokoško Jezero. This lake was once known as a habitat for a unique amphibian endemic variant of the Triton Salamander (Ichthyosaura alpestris reiseri). On the northern shore is a settlement of typical wooden shepherd huts, which in recent years has grown oversized with illegal recreational sheds that threaten the vulnerable ecosystem. Prokoško Jezero received a protected status in 2005 based on IUCN criteria, when it was declared a Monument of Nature by the BiH authorities. Despite these protective measures, it is not clear whether pollution connected to over-recreation will have become entirely fatal for the salamander.

== Tourism and recreation ==
=== Hiking ===
The Vranica mountains were only on the edges affected by combat during the 1992–1995 conflict. The central main ridge remained largely spared from warfare and the mine risk is therefore minimal. Also for that reason Vranica is an attractive destination for hikers, mountain bikers and tour skiers. A rough unpaved mountain road leads from Fojnica to Prokoško Jezero. A mountain hut—Rosinj P.D.—is located on the west side of the main ridge at 1,780 m (5,840 ft).

== See also ==
- List of mountains in Bosnia and Herzegovina

== Bibliography ==
- Guber, Mihovil (1943). "Pustošenje planinarskih objekata u južnoj Hrvatskoj" [The Desolation of Mountain Objects in Southern Croatia] (PDF). Hrvatski planinar (in Croatian). Vol. 39, no. 6–7. pp. 85–93. ISSN 0354-0650.
