= Zarožje =

Zarožje Зарожје
- Village (Selo)
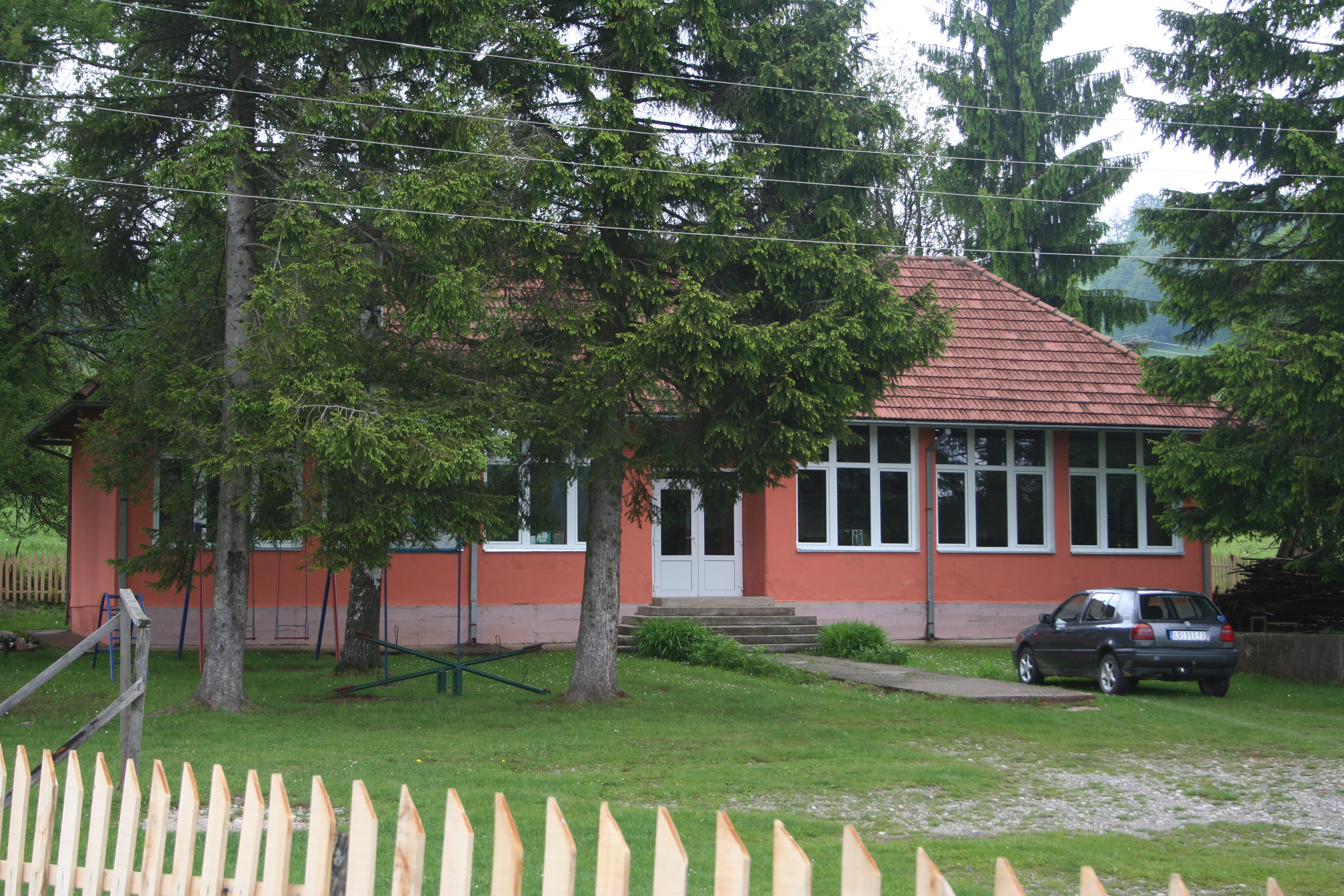
- Zarožje's hamlet of Pašina Ravan

- Location within Serbia
- Coordinates: 44°06′N 19°41′E
- Country: Serbia
- District: Zlatibor District
- Municipality: Bajina Bašta
- local municipality: Zarožje

Government
  - President of local community: Dragoman Jagodić

Area
  - Total: 18.98 sq mi (49.16 km^{2})
- Elevation: 1,610–3,220 ft (490–980 m)

Population (2011)
  - Total: 629
  - Density: 34/sq mi (13/km^{2})
  - Change 2002-11: ▼20.4%
- Time zone: UTC+1 (CET)
  - Summer (DST): UTC+2 (CEST)
- ZIP: 31255
- Area code: 031

Zarožje (Serbian Cyrillic: Зарожје) is a village in the municipality of Bajina Bašta, in western Serbia. Located on the slopes of the Povlen mountain, Zarožje has abundance of forests and meadows, and developed agriculture and husbandry. The village, and one of its features, the watermill, are best known as the inspiration for Milovan Glišić's 1880 short story After ninety years. It featured Sava Savanović, the most famous vampire in Serbian folklore. The story was filmed in 1973 as one of the most popular Serbian horror films, Leptirica.

According to the 2011 census, the village had 629 inhabitants, and was depopulating for decades.

== Location and geography ==
Zarožje is situated in the upper course of the Rogačica river, a right tributary to the Drina. It is located on the southern slopes of the Povlen, 30 km (19 mi) northeast from its municipal seat, Bajina Bašta. The Rogačica springs in the village area. It flows to the south, in the direction of Godečevo. East of Zarožje is Makovište and its hamlet of Crveni Breg. Both villages are in the Kosjerić municipality. Vujinovača, part of Valjevo, is to the north, while the Sokolina massif, 1,225 m (4,019 ft) high, is on the west.

Zarožje marks the extreme southeastern extension of the Azbukovica region, and in wider sense is between the Valjevo Mountains and Podrinje region. The surrounding area is a proper highland, which includes mountains and hills of Gnjila Priseka, Mali Povlen, Srednji Povlen, Veliki Povlen, Debelo Brdo, etc. The village itself spreads between the elevations of 490 and 980 m (1,610 and 3,220 ft). The hamlet of Pašina Ravan is at an elevation of 900 m (3,000 ft). The area is also dotted with numerous springs and wells, like Korita, Hladne Vode, and Bela Voda.

== History ==
Zarožje was named after horn-shaped boulders in the area (Serbian rog for horn, Zarožje literally meaning "place behind horns"). The same geographical features were source for the name of the Rogačica river ("little horn stream"). The two major, especially protruding rocks were called Roge by the locals, or in modern times, Rožje. According to local stories, every spring, the bravest young men from the surrounding areas would climb the rocks. The best would reach Roge and stick a spear between the rocks. Next year, if another man reached the top, he would replace the spear with his own.

Several other stories later developed as the name origin of Zarožje. According to one, Saint Sava, in order to save people from terror, turned a local vampire into stone. The vampire was then buried, with only his teeth protruding out of the ground, as a warning to the sinners. Another story claims the origin of the name came from the word zarozan, meaning disheveled, after townspeople from Užice were teasing peasants from Zarožje because of the way they dressed.

Original settlement on the location of modern village was the old town of Petrc. It was located in the locality of Rožajska Stena, which was also known as Petrina Stena. Present Zarožje was founded in the 18th century.

== Demographics ==
Historical population
Year	Pop.	±%
1948	1,470	—
1953	1,540	+4.8%
1961	1,583	+2.8%
1971	1,366	−13.7%
1981	1,176	−13.9%
1991	1,099	−6.5%
2002	790	−28.1%
2011	629	−20.4%

According to the 2011 census, Zarožje was depopulating settlement, with 629 inhabitants. Population reached historical high in the 1961 census, when there were 1,583 denizens. Since then, the population has been constantly declining.

Population is predominantly Serbian. Two main traditional slavas, celebrated by the families, are Saint John and Saint Nicholas, including the traditional annual summer fair on a Sunday before the Dormition of the Mother of God. The oldest settlers were the Kosić and Vasić families, who migrated from the Crmnica and Piva regions in Montenegro. Later settlers migrated from Goražde, Osat and Mokra Gora.

== Economy ==
Due to the lots of meadows on the Povlen's descent, the village used to be almost completely engaged in livestock breeding. By the 1990s it became a mixed agricultural-husbandry settlement, with 70,6% of inhabitants engaged in these two activities. There is an agricultural products collection center in the village, and a small, privately owned dairy which produced organic yoghurt. As tourism developed in Perućac and Tara, the road through the village, across Debelo Brdo pass, gained importance.

Main agricultural products are oats, rye and potatoes. Village area includes rich pastures and lush forests. By the 2020, raspberries became one of the dominant cultures, like in many parts of western Serbia, while production of potatoes also continued. There were large sheep herds, some with over 100 animals, but cattle and pigs are also kept. Fast and clear Rogačica river is a home to abundant trout population.

== Characteristics ==
Zarožje is a dispersed settlement. Village landscape is defined two parts which make it, Donje Zarožje (Upper Zarožje, 22.28 km^{2} (8.60 sq mi)) and Gornje Zarožje (Lower Zarožje, 26.88 km^{2} (10.38 sq mi)). In turn, they are divided in 11 hamlets. Kosići, Lazice, Barati, Tejići, and Pašina Ravan make Gornje Zarožje, while Donje Zarožje includes Lazarevići, Vujetići, Jagodići, Vasići, Prokići and Ćirkovići. Gornji Zarožje is further to the north, an up the Povlen.

The village has an old chapel in which, according to the legend, Serbian army received Holy Communion before the Battle of Kosovo in 1389. There are two modern Serbian Orthodox churches in Zarožje. The Church of Holy Trinity was built in 1991 in the hamlet of Jagodići, while the Church of the Holy Apostles Peter and Paul was built in 1993 in Pašina Ravan.

The hamlet of Golići is interesting to the mountaineers, while the nearby stony hills are naturally shaped like horns, resembling Đavolja Varoš in south Serbia, which gave the name to the village. They are part of the mountain massif of Sokolina. In the vicinity there are also two unexplored caves and the remains of an old Greek cemetery.

Statistically, Zarožje is classified as a rural settlement, and administratively, it is a local community, sub-municipal administrative unit within the Bajina Bašta municipality. President of the local community, in 2022, was Dragoman Jagodić.

The village was electrified in 1976. By the 1990s it had two four-grade elementary schools, healthcare dispensary and the local communitz office. There is also a memorial drinking fountain dedicated to Trifun Jevđenić.

== Watermill of Sava Savanović ==
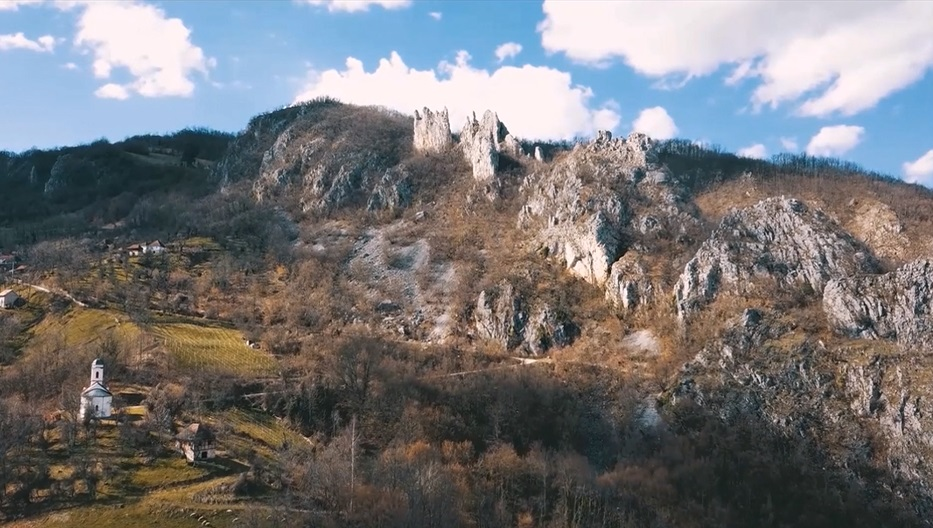
Village of Zarožje under the horned boulders, including Roge, the most protruding

According to the legend, there is a watermill in the village, which was often visited by Sava Savanović, the most famous vampire in Serbian folklore. It was said that he killed and drank blood of the millers when they would come to mill their grains. This inspired Milovan Glišić to write a short story about Savanović and his watermill in 1880, titled After ninety years. Film adaptation was directed by Đorđe Kadijević in 1973 and titled Leptirica ("female butterfly"). Modern inhabitants claim that the original vampire myth was invented by the thieves in the 19th century, who were burglarizing the villages and inventing horror stories about vampires who break into the houses to scare villagers and prevent them from looking for the thieves.

The watermill is located 3 km (1.9 mi) from the Bajina Bašta-Valjevo road, in the deep valley of the Rogačica river. The location of the mill has been described as a "narrow and dark ravine". Road to the watermills separates in the Gnjila Prisoka hamlet. The mill itself is at an elevation of 607 m (1,991 ft). For the last several decades the watermill associated with Savanović has been owned by the Jagodić family and is usually called "Jagodića vodenica" (Jagodići's watermill). It was in operation until the late 1950s. After its closure, it became a tourist site along with other attractions in Valjevo and nearby villages.

By the early 2010s, the ownership problems were resolved and the local administration to reconstruct the watermill made of wood and stone, and to adapt it into the proper tourist attraction. Plans also included that the watermill will be operational again, producing the flour named after Sava Savanović while the local farmers would sell honey and rakia. A construction of the proper road which would connect it to the main one was also planned. Author of the reconstruction project was architect Aleksandar Gavović.

The first finished project was the road, but just a month after it was completed, the mill collapsed in 2012. The municipal authorities issued a tongue-in-cheek public health warning, advising people that Savanović was now free to look for a new home. In 2011 it was evident that it may collapse soon, but local authorities hoped it will make it to the reconstruction. The project of recreating the watermill in its authentic form was made, but there was a lack of funding. Originally, only the roof collapsed (in 2012) but in the next years the wooden walls buckled, too.

By December 2018, the mill was reconstructed, and the access road was partially improved. The foundations and the pillars were reinforced, and the new roof was built and tiled. Works are scheduled to continue in the spring of 2019 when the mill wheel, grinding stone and artificial widening of the stream will be finished. After this is completed, the mill should become operational again.

By December 2022, the mill was renovated, but wasn't operational ("dry docked"). The doors of the "watermill of fear" are always open. Despite the lack of roads, organization, guides and still unfinished structure, by 2022 some 16,000 people were visiting the watermill yearly.
