= Taor (Valjevo) =

Taor Таор
- Village
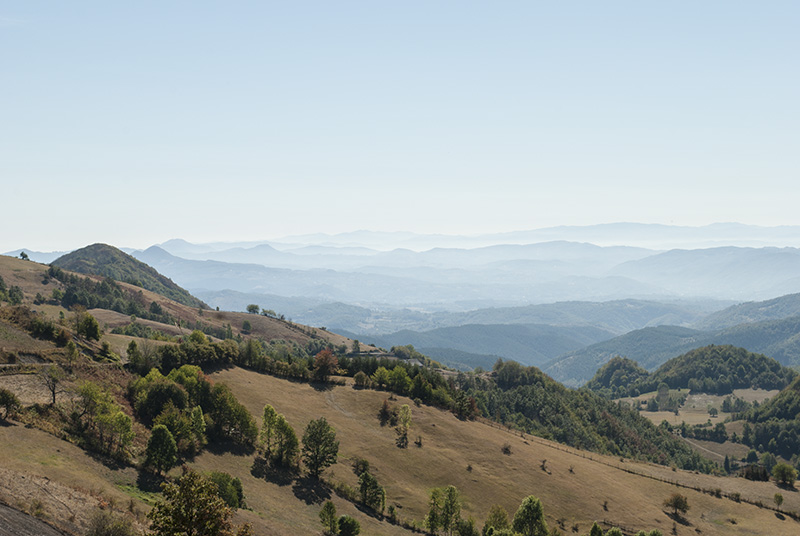

- Location within Serbia
- Coordinates: 44°07′07″N 19°47′00″E
- Country: Serbia
- District: Kolubara District
- Municipality: Valjevo

Population (2022)
  - Total: 245
- Time zone: UTC+1 (CET)
  - Summer (DST): UTC+2 (CEST)

Taor is a village in the municipality of Valjevo, Serbia. According to the 2022 census, the village has a population of 245.

== History ==
In the surrounding area there are numerous traces of ancient mining activities, including mining of copper and iron. In November 2019 it was announced that the remains of the Byzantine church were discovered close to the Taor Springs. Remains of the Early Byzantium-style church are part of the wider complex, with parts of small fortification and presumably a mining settlement being located for now. It is located at an altitude of 890 m (2,920 ft), on the prehistoric and Antiquity travelling corridor from the valley of the Kolubara river to the Užice depression. Remains from the Stone Age, Iron Age, Antiquity and Middle Ages have been found along the corridor. Church dimensions are 11 m × 7 m (36 ft × 23 ft), it has arched altar area and is surrounded by the dry stone wall made of large chunks of stones and boulders, which is 100 m (330 ft) long and 2 m (6 ft 7 in) wide.

== Taor Springs ==
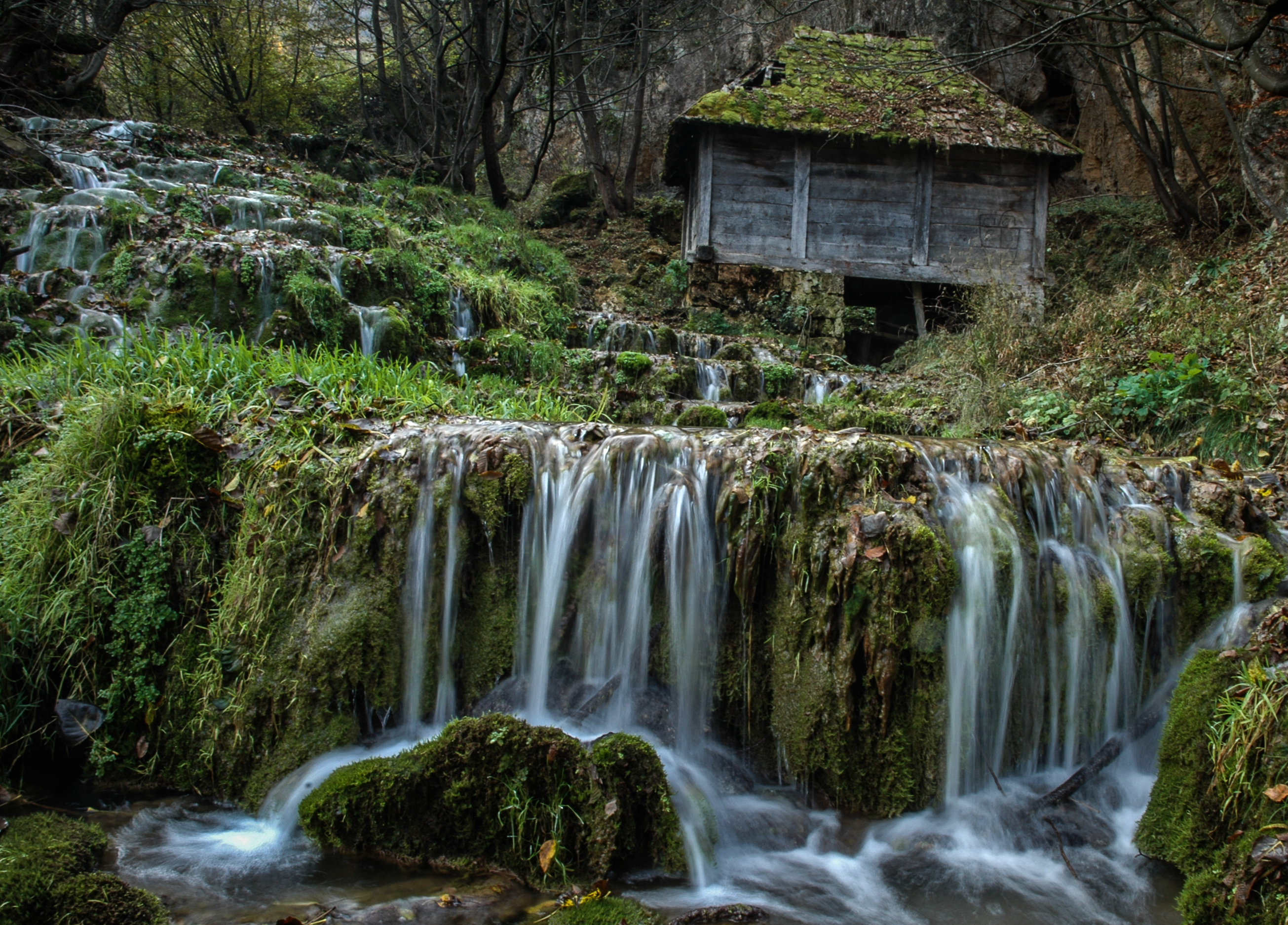
Cascades at the Taor springs

Historical population
Year	Pop.	±%
1948	693	—
1953	723	+4.3%
1961	663	−8.3%
1971	574	−13.4%
1981	493	−14.1%
1991	424	−14.0%
2002	378	−10.8%
2011	303	−19.8%

The village is located on the Povlen mountain. One of the attraction of the Povlen are the "Taor Springs" (Taorska vrela). Beautiful cascades were used in many touristic brochures in the Former Yugoslavia. They are located at the village's hamlet of Donji Taor ("Lower Taor"). It is located in the southwestern section of the mountain, 40 km (25 mi) southeast of Valjevo and 16 km (9.9 mi) northwest of Kosjerić. Majority of the location is covered in beech forests and the location is especially known for bear's garlic, which is abundant. It grows on the shady slopes and in the woods. An annual "Days of Bear's Garlic" festival has been established in 2015.

The Taor is known for its tufa rocks, on which the Taor springs formed cascades on the 400 m (1,300 ft) long slope, which ultimately flow into the Skrapež river. In the 1980s, when the Kosjerić waterworks was constructed, the springs were partially capped and transferred to the town's water system. Though the project wasn't conducted fully as planned, it still harmed the cascades as during droughty years, the water dries out completely. The area was placed under preliminary protection, but on paper only. Locals were digging the tufa stones, ruining the waterfalls and the entire environment.

There were 12 watermills on the springs, but as of 2017, none of them are operational, with only a few still physically surviving. By 2019 only three derelict ones remained (Delićka, Drojićka and Pejina), but the fourth one, Pepića watermill, was fully restored and became operational in 2018.
