= Jablanik =

Mountain in Serbia

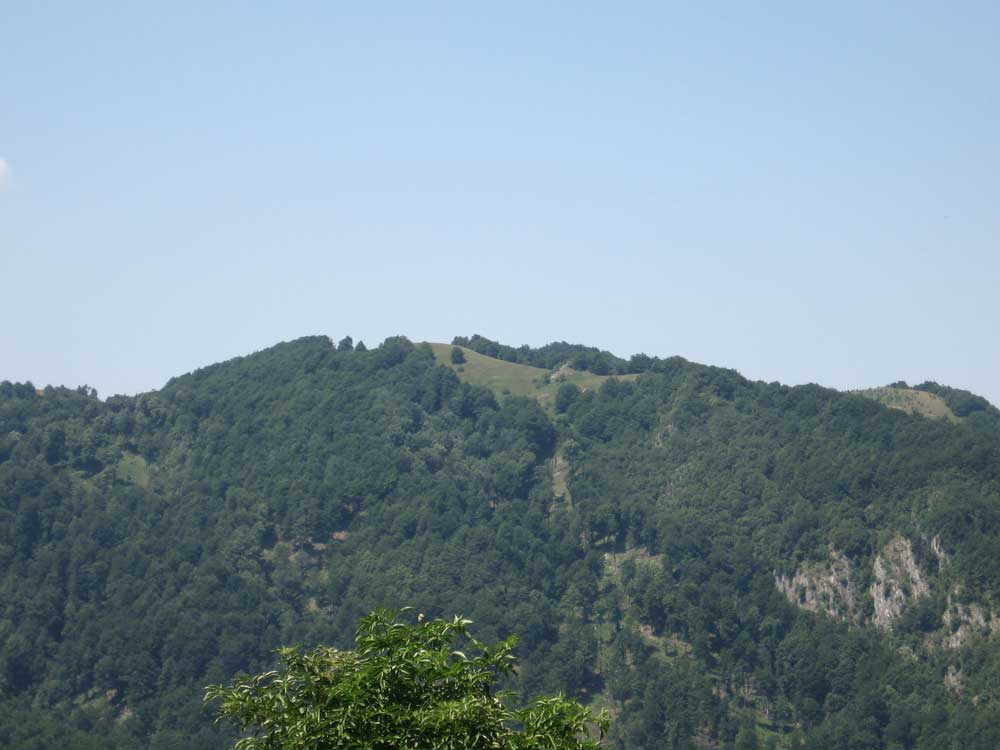

Highest point
- Elevation: 1,275 m (4,183 ft)
- Coordinates: 44°10′35″N 19°40′01″E

Geography
- Location within Serbia
- Location: Western Serbia
- Parent range: Dinaric Alps

Jablanik (Serbian Cyrillic: Јабланик) is a mountain in western Serbia, near the town of Valjevo. Its highest peak, Jablanik, has an elevation of 1,275 meters above sea level.

Jablanik is located at the source of the river Jablanica. It is separated from nearby Medvednik mountain by the high Stolica Pass, while the Debelo Brdo saddle separates it from Povlen in the southeast. The hills around the peak are mainly forested but the peak itself is barren, so if visibility is good the view from above is breathtaking.

== Gallery ==
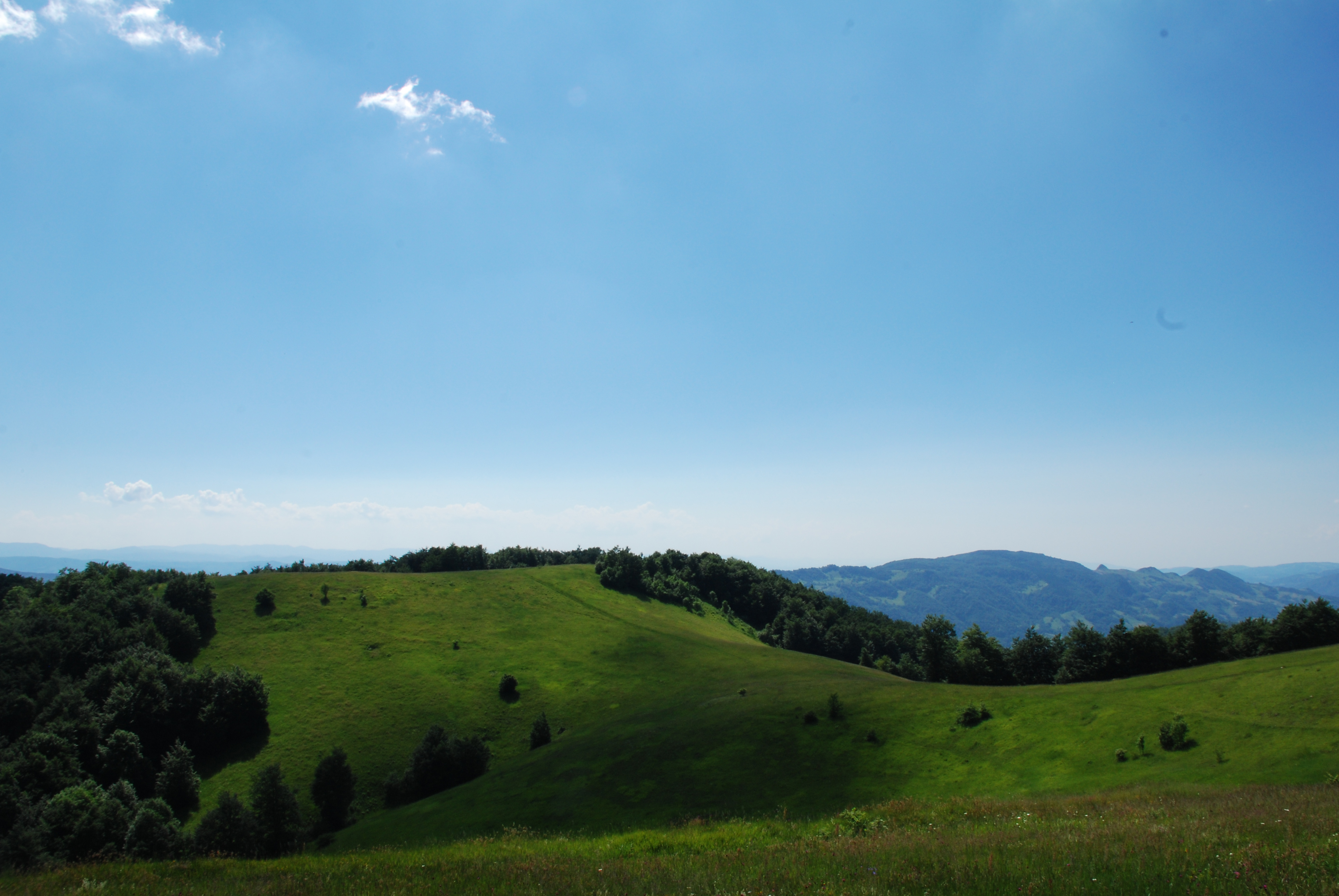

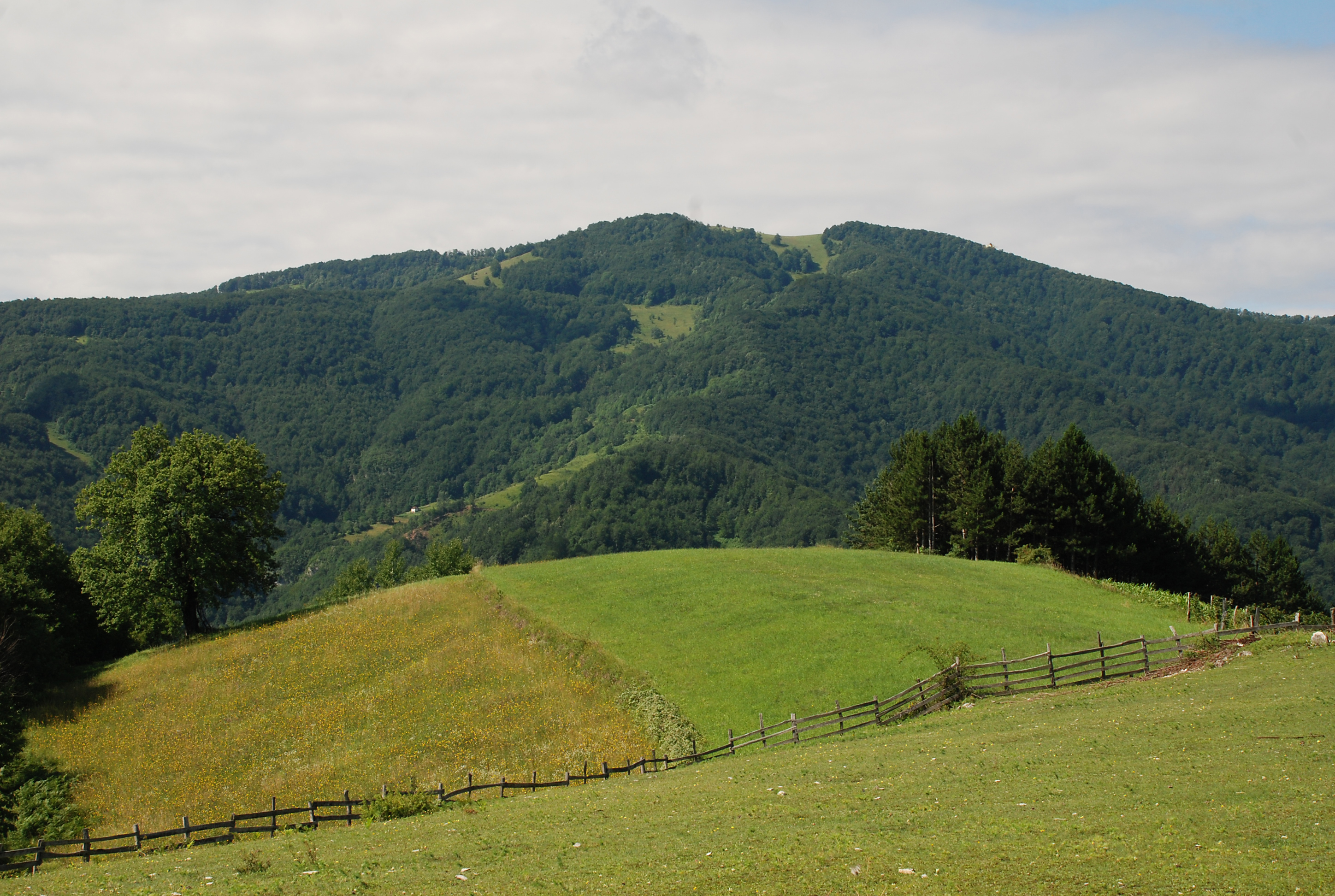

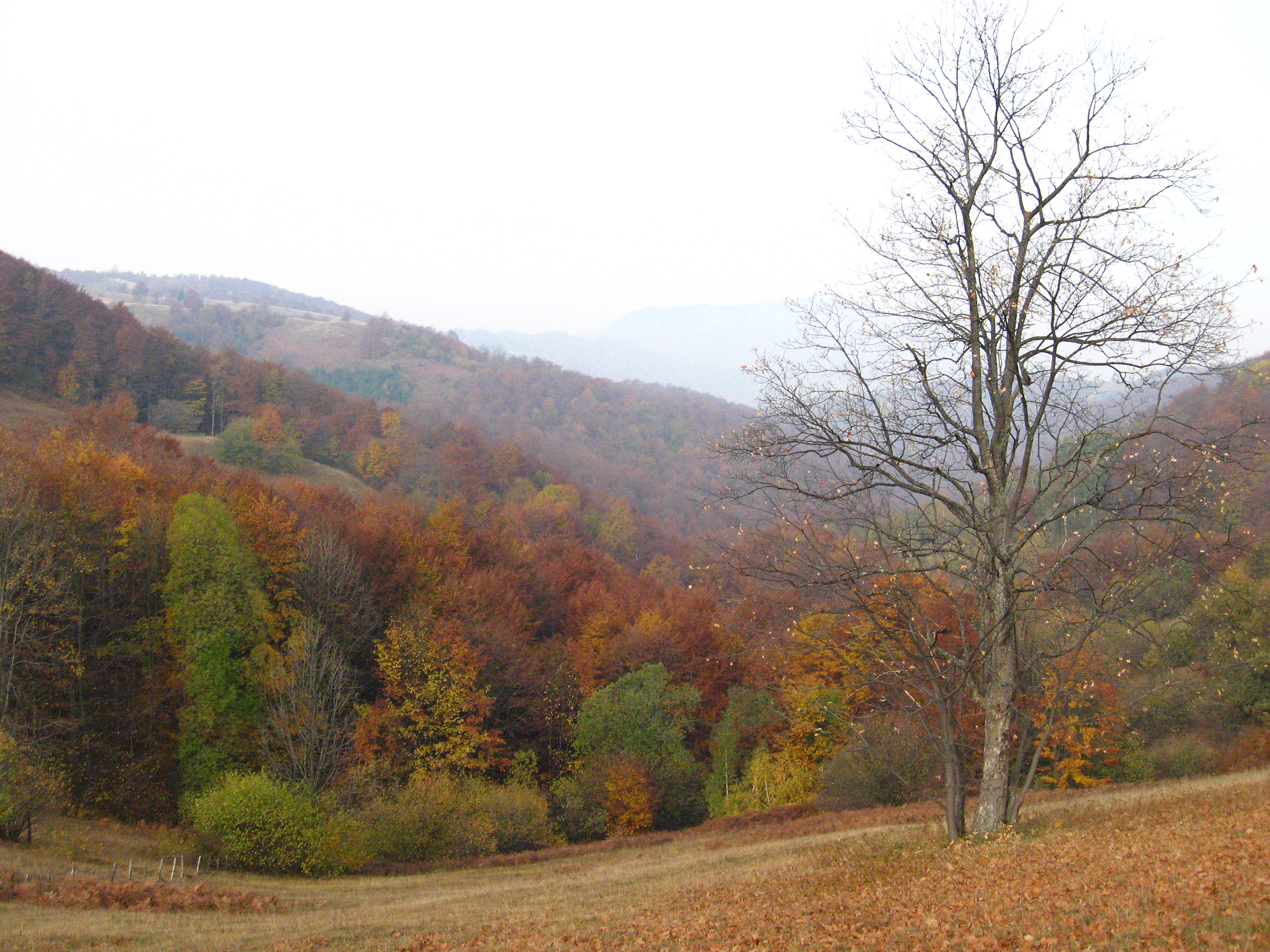

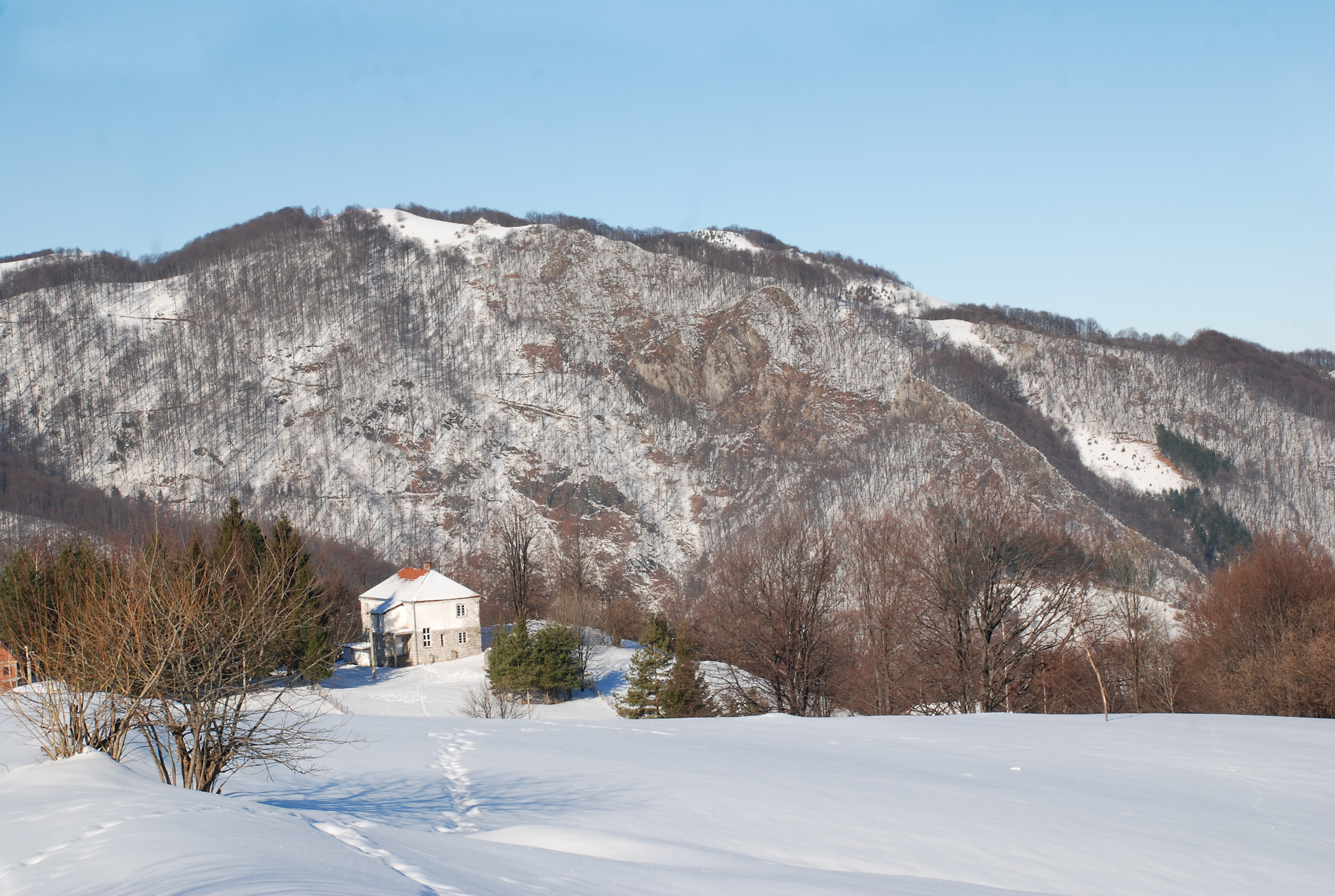

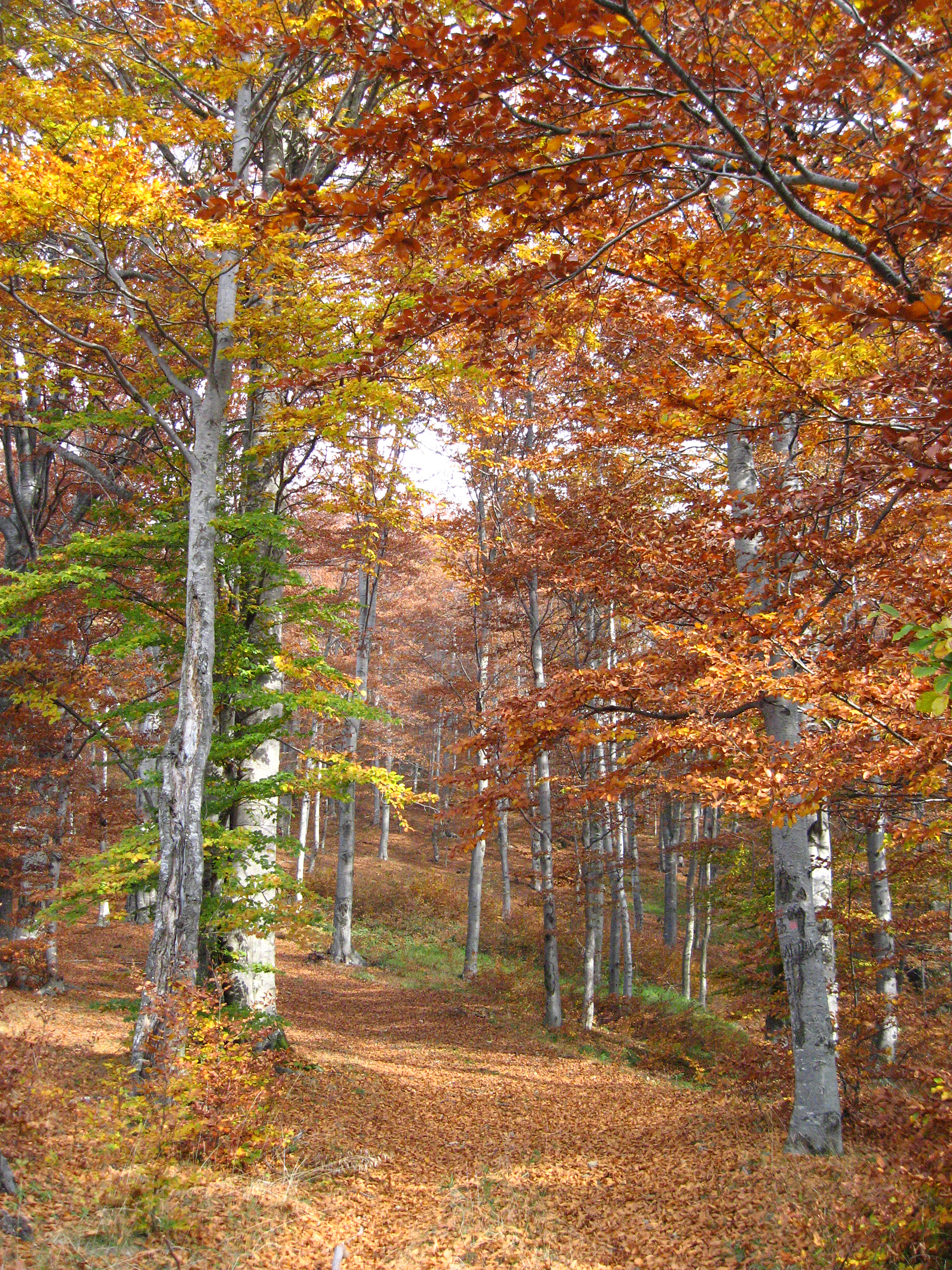

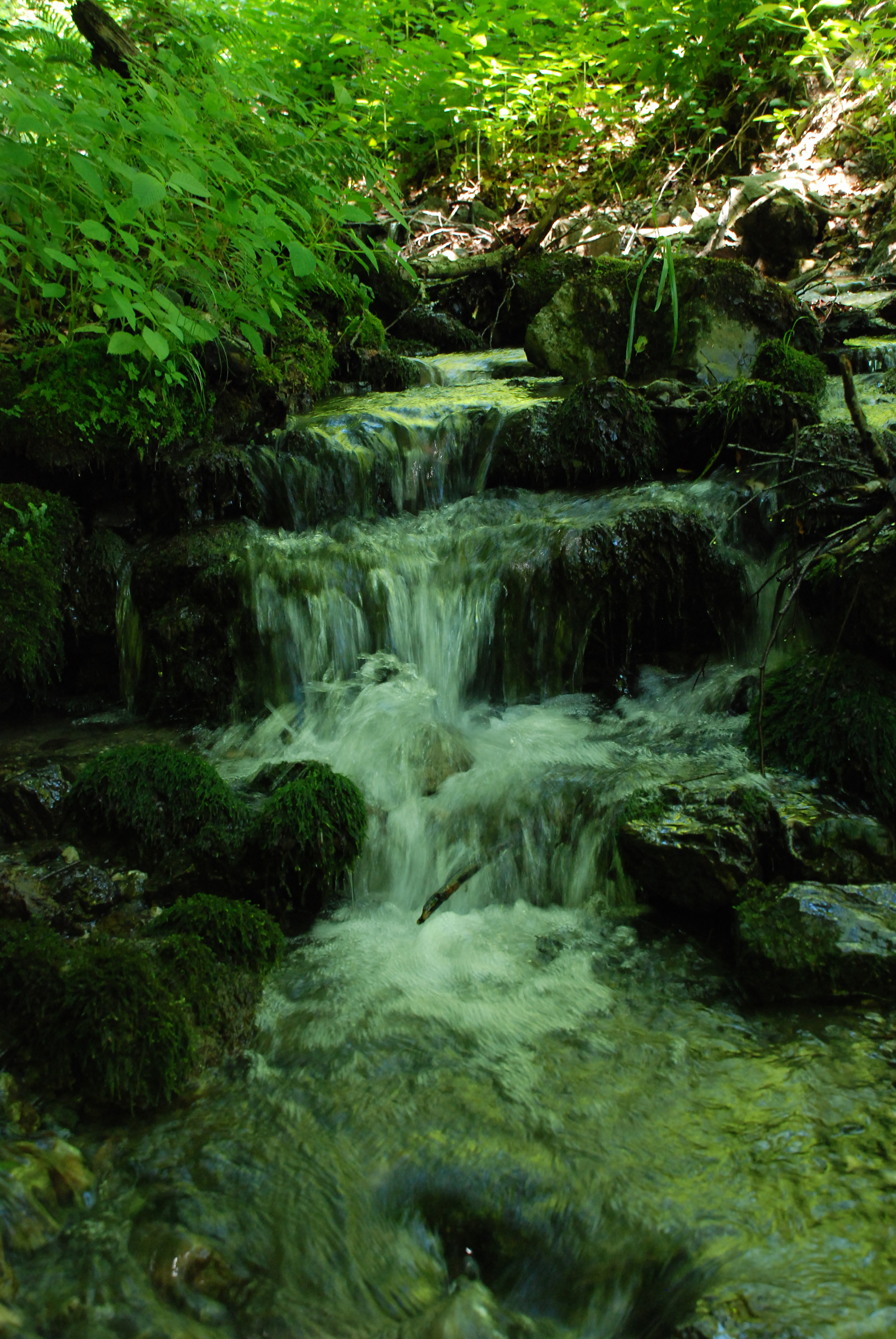

== See also ==
- List of mountains in Serbia
