= Northern Mountain Range =

Northern Mountain Range may refer to:

- Albania: Northern Mountain Range (Albania)
- Dominican Republic: Cordillera Septentrional
- India: Himalayas
- Serbia: Valjevo mountains or Serbian Carpathians
- U.S.A.: Alaskan mountain ranges
