= Valjevo Mountains =

Highlands in Serbia

The Valjevo Mountains (Ваљевске планине, Valjevske planine) is a highland in western Serbia, in the northeastern part of the Dinaric Alps. It stretches for about 50 km west of Valjevo towards Mačva and forms a natural border between the north-western and southern Serbia.

Its major mountains include Debelo Brdo (1,094m), Magleš (1,036m), Medvednik (1,247m), Jablanik (1,275), Povlen (1,347m), Maljen (1,104m) and Suvobor (866m), the latter including Ravna Gora highland and Rajac mountain. On Povlen lays the source of the Sušica river.

== See also ==
- List of mountains in Serbia
