= Byzantine Empire under the Theodosian dynasty =

Eastern Roman Empire from 379 to 457

Roman Empire: Βασιλεία Ῥωμαίων (Ancient Greek); Imperium Romanum (Latin)
- 379–457
- Chi Rho (see Byzantine insignia)

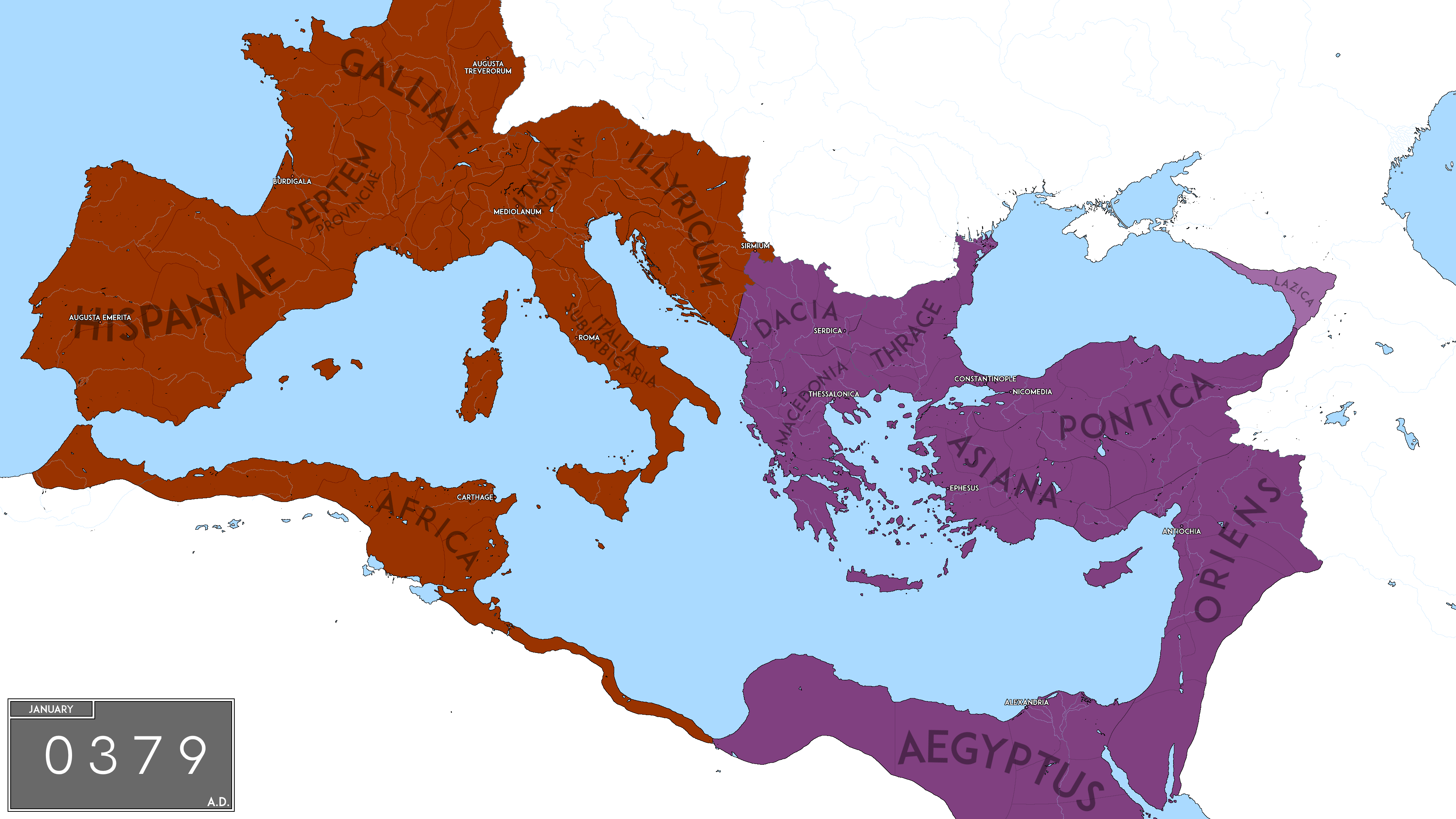
- The territory of the Eastern Roman Empire, with the Western Roman Empire depicted in orange, at the beginning of Theodosius I's reign.
- Capital: Constantinople
- Common languages: Latin, Greek
- Government: Monarchy
- Emperor
  - 379–395: Theodosius I
  - 395–408: Arcadius
  - 408–450: Theodosius II
  - 450–457: Marcian
- History
  - accession of Theodosius I: 19 January 379
  - death of Marcian: January 457
| Preceded by | Succeeded by |
| Byzantine Empire under the Constantinian and Valentinianic dynasties | Byzantine Empire under the Leonid dynasty |

The Eastern Roman Empire was ruled by the Theodosian dynasty from 379, the accession of Theodosius I, to 457, the death of Marcian. The rule of the Theodosian dynasty saw the final east–west division of the Roman Empire, between Arcadius and Honorius in 395. Whilst divisions of the Roman Empire had occurred before, the Empire would never again be fully reunited. The reign of the sons of Theodosius I contributed heavily to the crisis that under the fifth century eventually resulted in the complete collapse of the western Roman court.

The Eastern Empire was largely spared the difficulties faced by the West in the third and fourth centuries, due in part to a more firmly established urban culture and greater financial resources, which allowed it to placate invaders with tribute and pay foreign mercenaries. Throughout the fifth century, various invading armies overran the Western Empire but spared the east.

The Theodosian dynasty also ruled the Western Roman Empire from 392 to 455 AD.

== Theodosius I, 379-395 ==
On January 19 379 Theodosius I was granted rule of the Eastern Roman provinces by the Western Augustus, Gratian of the Valentinian dynasty, after the death of the Eastern Augustus Valens at Adrianople in 378. Theodosius was tasked with reorganizing the destroyed Roman army and defeat the bands of Gothic warriors that roamed the Balkans. To recuperate the manpower losses from Adrianople, Theodosius introduced harsh and thorough conscription laws, including a significant increase in the number of non-Roman recruits. After a serious defeat against the Goths in 380, Theodosius shifted to a diplomatic strategy; on 3 October 382, his Magister militum, Saturninus, signed a treaty with the remaining Goths, allowing their settlement in Moesia, Thracia, Dacia Ripensis and Macedonia. Unlike previous resettled barbarians, the Goths retained their native military organization, fighting under the guide of their chieftains.

Gratian would continue to rule the Western Roman Empire until his death in 383. After the deaths of Gratian and his successor Valentinian II, Theodosius became the last emperor to rule over both the eastern and the western halves of the Roman Empire from 392 to 395.

Theodosius is also remembered for making a series of decrees (see Edict of Thessalonica) that essentially codified Nicene Christianity as the official state church of the Roman Empire. Theodosius dissolved the order of the Vestal Virgins in Rome, banned the pagan rituals of the Olympics in Ancient Greece and did nor punish nor prevent the destruction of antique Hellenistic temples, such as the Temple of Apollo in Delphi.

With the death of Theodosius in 395, the Roman Empire was divided once more between his two sons. Arcadius, the older son, inherited the East and the imperial capital of Constantinople, and Honorius inherited the West. The Empire would never be reunited again, though Eastern Roman emperors, beginning with Zeno, would claim the de jure united title after Julius Nepos' death in 480 AD.

== Arcadius, 395-408 ==
Arcadius was a weak ruler, dominated by a series of figures behind the throne as he was more concerned with appearing to be a pious Christian than he was with political and military matters. The first such figure, Rufinus, engendered intense competition with the counterpart of Western Emperor Honorius, magister militum of half-Vandal origin Flavius Stilicho, who might have had him assassinated in 395 AD. Later figures in actual power would include consul Eutropius risen from eunuch, general Gainas of Gothic origin, his wife Aelia Eudoxia, the Patriarch John Chrysostom and Praetorian Prefect Anthemius.

== Theodosius II, 408-450 ==
Theodosius II, sometimes nicknamed "the Younger", became Eastern Roman Emperor at the age of seven following the death of his father Arcadius in 408. Praetorian Prefect Anthemius continued to act as a power behind the throne, during whose tenure the Theodosian walls of Constantinople were completed.

The older sister of Theodosius, Pulcheria, was proclaimed Augusta and became regent in 414 AD. Though the regency ended in 416 and Theodosius became Augustus himself, Pulcheria remained a strong influence within the government. Influenced by Pulcheria and fueled by an increasing devotion to Christianity, Theodosius went to war against the Sassanid Empire in the early 420s, on the pretext of defending Christians from persecution. He was forced to accept a stalemate however, as the Huns were marching on Constantinople. The wars with the Huns were usually composed by Hunnic raids being followed by significant payments by the Eastern Empire so that the Huns would remain at peace with the Romans.

The death of Honorius of the West in 423 led Theodosius to supporting and eventually installing Valentinian III as Western Emperor in 425. To strengthen ties between East and West, Licinia Eudoxia, daughter of Theodosius, was betrothed to Valentinian.

Theodosius died in 450 as the result of a riding accident and was succeeded by Marcian, husband of his sister Pulcheria, as Eastern Emperor.

== Marcian, 450-457 ==
Marcian would reverse many of the actions taken by Theodosius II, particularly in terms of treaties with the Huns and in religious affairs. All Eastern Roman tributary payments to Attila ceased under Marcian while Attila was busy invading Italy. Marcian launched preemptive expeditions across the Danube into the Hunnic heartland, winning significant victories against them. The actions of Marcian, combined with famine in Italy, forced Attila to retreat back to the Hungarian plains where he would die in 453. After the death of Attila, Marcian would settle many formerly hunnic vassal tribes within Eastern Roman lands as foederati, taking advantage of the fall of the Hunnic empire.

He would be succeeded by Leo I, the first Emperor of the Leonid dynasty.

== Timeline ==
- Red denotes Eastern (or sole) Emperors
- Pink denotes Western Emperors
- Orange denotes Caesars
- Yellow denotes Nobelissimoi

== See also ==
- Theodosian dynasty
- Family tree of Byzantine emperors
