= Stojnik (Sopot) =

Stojnik Стојник
- Village
- Location within Serbia
- Coordinates: 44°30′N 20°29′E
- Country: Serbia
- District: Belgrade District
- Municipality: Sopot

Population (2022)
  - Total: ▼510
- Time zone: UTC+1 (CET)
  - Summer (DST): UTC+2 (CEST)

Stojnik (Serbian Cyrillic: Стојник) is a village in the municipality of Sopot, Serbia. According to the 2022 census, the village has a population of 510 people.
