= Byzantine Empire under the Leonid dynasty =

Byzantine Empire: Imperium Romanum (Latin); Βασιλεία Ῥωμαίων (Ancient Greek)
- 457–518
- Chi Rho (see Byzantine insignia)

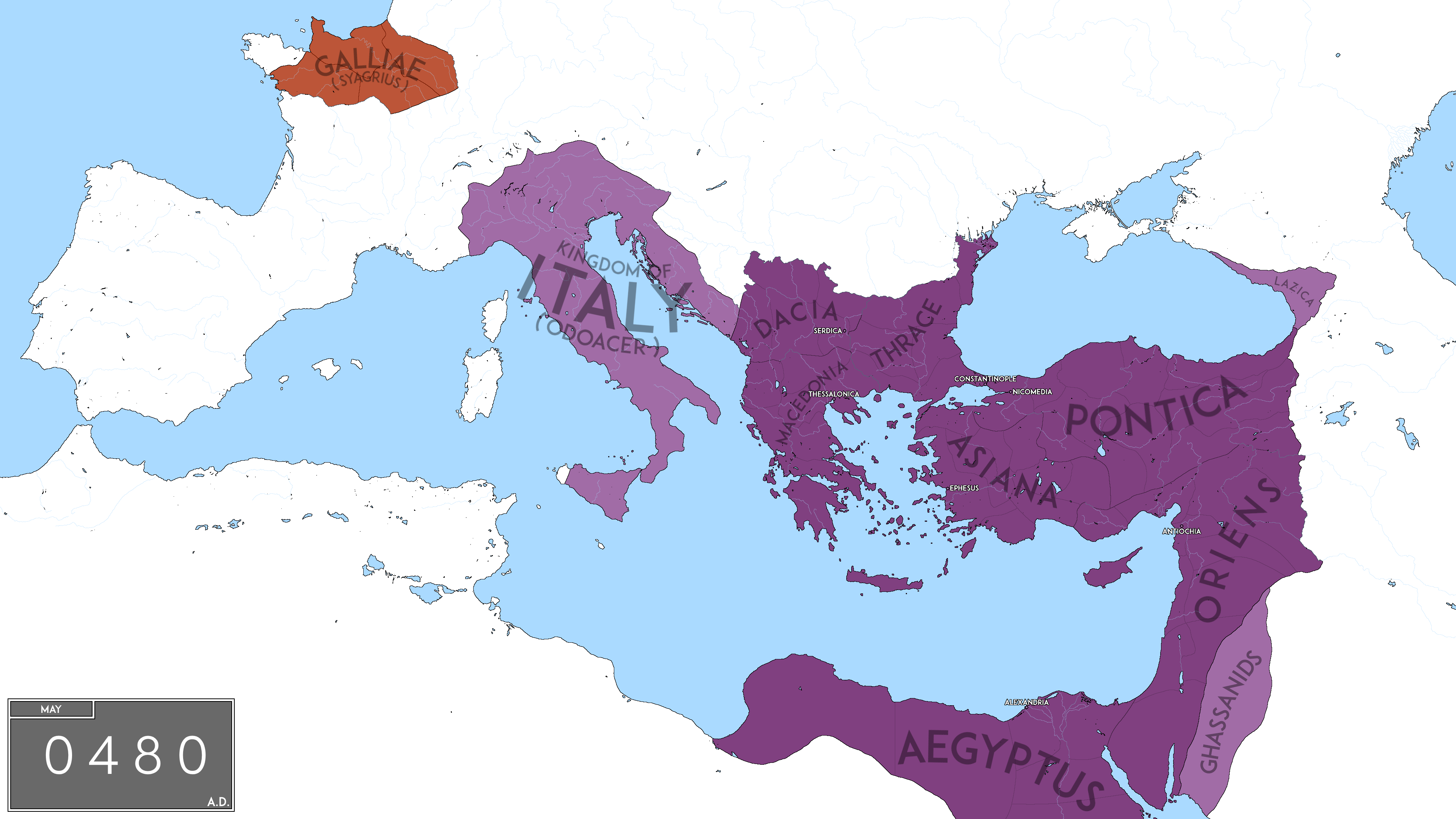
- The territory of the Eastern Roman Empire under the Leonid dynasty in 480. The Western Roman Empire, depicted in light purple, collapsed in 476/480, though the regions depicted nominally continued to be under Roman rule as vassals of the Eastern Empire. Orange is the Western Roman rump state at the time of Syagrius, now called the Kingdom of Soissons
- Capital: Constantinople
- Common languages: Latin, Greek
- Government: Monarchy
- Emperor
  - 457–474: Leo I
  - 474–474: Leo II
  - 474–491: Zeno
  - 475–476: Basiliscus
  - 491–518: Anastasius I
- History
  - accession of Leo I the Thracian: 7 February 457
  - death of Anastasius I Dicorus: 9 July 518
Preceded by	Succeeded by
Byzantine Empire under the Theodosian dynasty	Byzantine Empire under the Justinian dynasty

The Eastern Roman Empire was ruled by the Leonid dynasty from AD 457, the accession of Leo I, to 518, the death of Anastasius I. The rule of the Leonid dynasty coincided with the rapid decline, collapse and eventual fall of the Western Roman Empire. Following the end of the Western Empire, Emperor Zeno abolished the position of Western Roman Emperor and declared himself the sole Roman Emperor. The Eastern Roman Empire would come to last for several more centuries, and subsequent dynasties would invest large amounts of resources in attempts to retake the western provinces.

The Leonid dynasty also ruled the Western Roman Empire from 474 to its abolition in AD 480.

== Leo I and Leo II, 457–474 ==
After the death of Marcian and the end of the Theodosian dynasty, Leo I was placed upon the throne by the Alan general Aspar, who served as commander-in-chief of the Eastern Roman army and enjoyed a role similar to that of Ricimer in the Western Roman Empire, appointing puppet emperors. Aspar had believed that Leo I would be a weak puppet, but Leo grew increasingly independent of him and after Aspar and his son Ardabur were murdered in a riot in 471, the Eastern Empire was restored to fully Roman leadership, which it would retain for centuries to come.

By the time of Leo's accession, the Western Roman Empire had nearly collapsed entirely. Though it enjoyed a brief restoration of power under Emperor Majorian, the West had become restricted to northern Gaul, Italy and parts of Illyria by the late 460s. Leo attempted to reconquer North Africa from the Vandals. The campaign was unsuccessful and Northern Africa would remain outside of imperial control until the reign of Justinian I in the early 500s.

Leo I was the earliest emperor to be crowned by the Patriarch of Constantinople and not by a military leader, representing the ecclesiastical hierarchy. This change would eventually become permanent and the religious nature of the coronation had completely replaced the military version in the Middle Ages.

As condition for an alliance with the Isaurians, Leo married his daughter Ariadne to Tarasicodissa, who took the name Zeno, in 466. The son of Ariadne and Zeno, Leo II, succeeded upon the death of Leo I in 474 but he died after only 11 months of rule and was succeeded by Zeno.

== Zeno and Basiliscus, 474–491 ==
The reign of Zeno saw the end of the Western Roman Empire. The dating of the end is somewhat controversial. It is sometimes dated to 476, early in Zeno's reign, when the Germanic Roman general Odoacer deposed the titular Western Emperor Romulus Augustulus, but declined to replace him with another puppet. Odoacer accepted Julius Nepos, the previously deposed Western Emperor supported by Zeno, as his sovereign and acted as his viceroy of Italy. Nepos did not return to Italy but continued to reign as Western Emperor from Dalmatia until his death in 480.

After the death of Julius Nepos, Zeno became the sovereign of Odoacer and he did not appoint another Western Emperor, instead proclaiming himself as the sole Emperor of the Roman Empire, juridically reuniting West and East for the first time in 85 years. The position would never again be divided.

With Odoacer acting increasingly independent, Zeno negotiated with the Ostrogoths of Theoderic, who had settled in Moesia. He sent the gothic king to Italy as magister militum per Italiam ("commander in chief for Italy"). After the fall of Odoacer in 493, Theoderic, who had lived in Constantinople during his youth, ruled Italy on his own. Thus, by suggesting that Theoderic conquer Italy as his Ostrogothic Kingdom, Zeno maintained at least a nominal supremacy in the West land while ridding the Eastern Empire of an unruly subordinate.

Zeno was briefly deposed by Basilicus in 475 for twenty months, but regained his throne and imprisoned Basilicus and his family in a dry cistern, where they would die from exposure.

== Anastasius I, 491–518 ==
Anastasius I, an aged civil officer of Roman origin, became Roman Emperor through marriage with the widow of Zeno, Ariadne, in 491. Anastasius reformed the coinage system introduced by Constantine I by setting the weight of the copper follis, the most commonly used coin throughout the Empire. Anastasius also abolished the chrysargyron tax, a tax that was hated due to it being collected in lump sums every four years. The monetary reforms of Anastasius lead to the State Treasury containing an enormous 145,150 kg (320,000 lbs) of gold upon his death.

Anastasius would be succeeded by Justin I, the first Emperor of the Justinian dynasty.

== See also ==
- Family tree of Byzantine emperors

== Sources ==
- Grierson, Philip (1999). Byzantine Coinage (PDF). Washington, DC: Dumbarton Oaks. ISBN 0-88402-274-9. Archived from the original (PDF) on 27 September 2007.
- Treadgold, Warren (1997). A History of the Byzantine State and Society. Stanford, California: Stanford University Press. ISBN 0-8047-2630-2..
