= Povlen =

Mountain in Serbia

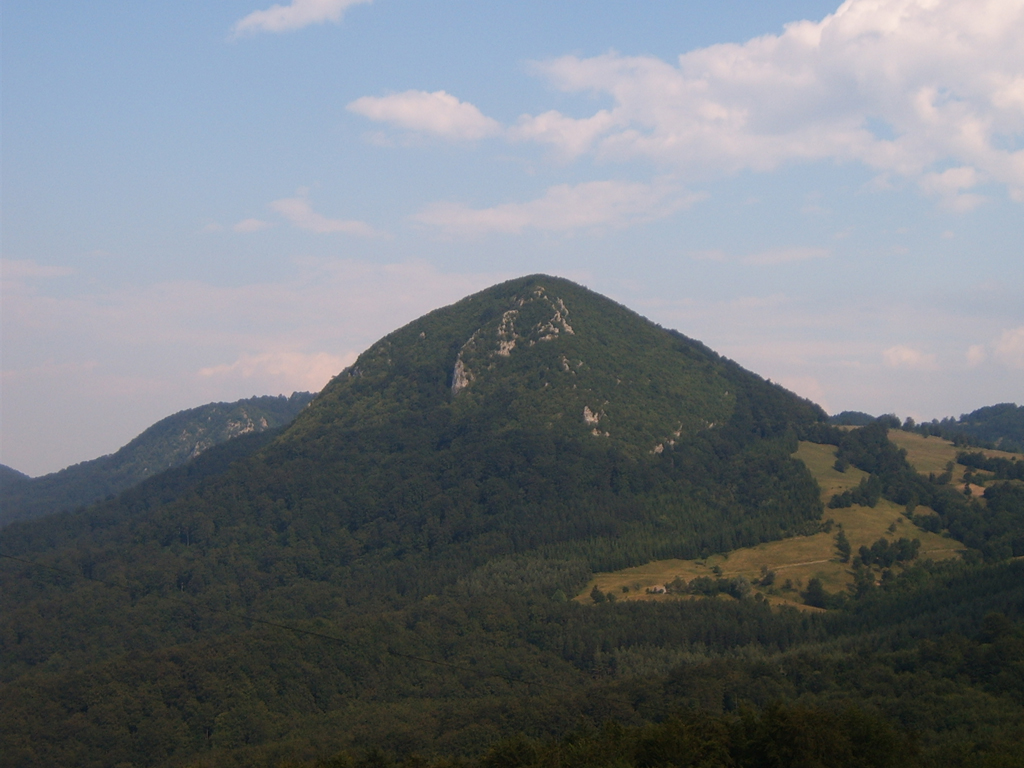

Highest point
- Elevation: 1,347 m (4,419 ft)
- Coordinates: 44°07′50″N 19°44′25″E

Geography
- Location within Serbia
- Location: Western Serbia
- Parent range: Dinaric Alps

Povlen (Serbian: Повлен) is a mountain in western Serbia, some 30 kilometers to the west of the city of Valjevo. It has several peaks, the three most important being Mali Povlen (1,347 m (4,419 ft)), Srednji Povlen (1,301 m (4,268 ft)) and Veliki Povlen (1,271 m (4,170 ft)).

== Geography ==
Povlen belongs to the Valjevo Mountains, which form the highland west of Valjevo towards Mačva. The mountains are not very high, their highest point, Mali Povlen, reaches to 1,347 m (4,419 ft), but they are difficult to cross. Dense forests and deep river canyons hide narrow and winding roads that lead to small hamlets.

In the canyon of Trešnjica under Povlen, there is a colony of griffon vultures. Eagles and hawks also live on the mountain. Successful program of brown bears protection was conducted on the Tara mountain in the 21st century, some 80 km (50 mi) southwest of the Povlen. As the number of bears grew, by the 2020s they re-appeared on the Povlen, too.

== History ==
In 2019 it was announced that the remains of the Byzantine church were discovered. The object was discovered close to the Taor Springs, some 40 km (25 mi) from Valjevo. Remains of the Early Byzantium-style church are part of the wider complex, with parts of small fortification and presumably a mining settlement being located for now. It is located at an altitude of 890 m (2,920 ft), on the prehistoric and Antiquity travelling corridor from the valley of the Kolubara river to the Užice depression. Remains from the Stone Age, Iron Age, Antiquity and Middle Ages have been found along the corridor. Church dimensions are 11 m × 7 m (36 ft × 23 ft), it has arched altar area and is surrounded by the dry stone wall made of large chunks of stones and boulders, which is 100 m (330 ft) long and 2 m (6 ft 7 in) wide.

In the surrounding area there are numerous traces of ancient mining activities, including mining of copper and iron. Also, this is the fourth such church discovered in the Valjevo region in the past several years. In the village of Brangović there are remains of the fortification, called Jerinin Grad, with the remains of the church quite similar to the one discovered in Taor. With another fortification in the village of Ćelije, the archeologists theoreticize that all this objects were connected in the wider but specific complex. Also, the findings point to the idea that every village, even unfortified ones, had their own churches during the period of Early Byzantium.

In 2017, a scenic viewpoint "Gates of Podrinje" was adapted for visitors on the southeast slopes, at an elevation of 925 m (3,035 ft). Located in the village of Ovčinja, the concrete and wood plateau include benches, parking spots and kiosk with vending and coffee machines.

== Features ==
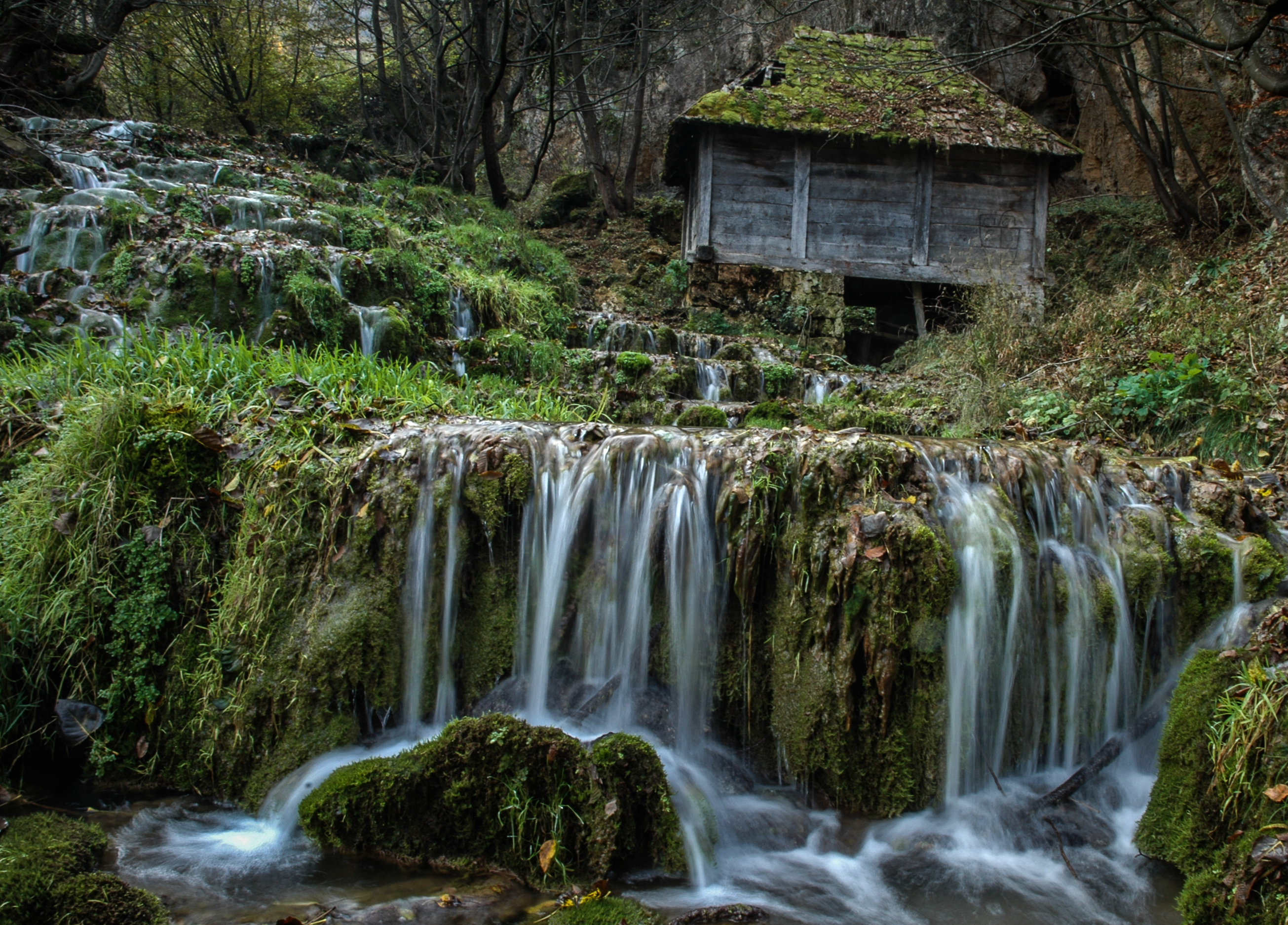
Cascades at the Taor Springs

One of the attraction of the Povlen are the Taor Springs (Taorska vrela). They are located at the village of Taor's hamlet of Donji Taor. It is located in the southwestern section of the mountain, 40 km (25 mi) southeast of Valjevo and 16 km (9.9 mi) northwest of Kosjerić. Majority of the location is covered in beech forests and the location is especially known for bear's garlic, which is abundant. It grows on the shady slopes and in the woods. An annual "Days of Bear's Garlic" festival has been established in 2015.

The Taor is known for its tufa rocks, on which the Taor springs formed cascades on the 400 m (1,300 ft) long slope, which ultimately flow into the Skrapež river. In the 1980s. when the Kosjerić waterworks was constructed, the springs were partially capped and transferred to town's water system. Though the project wasn't conducted fully as planned, it still harmed the cascades as during the droughty years, the water dries out completely. The area was placed under the preliminary protection, but on paper only. Locals were digging the tufa stones, ruining the waterfalls and the entire environment.

There were 12 watermills on the springs, but as of 2017, none of them are operational, with only a few still physically surviving. By 2019 only three derelict ones remained (Delićka, Drojićka and Pejina), but the fourth one, Pepića watermill, was fully restored and became operational in 2018.

== Folklore ==
Area of Povlen is known for its myths. Southern extension of the now extinct Pannonian Sea, which drained out some 600,000 years ago, reached Povlen. Hence, fossils of the sea snails are occasionally being found, which influenced the myth about the massive ring, which allegedly exists somewhere on the mountain, by which Noah moored his ark after the deluge. Large balls, called the "Povlen balls" (Povlenske kugle), which are results of an underwater volcanic activity during the existence of the sea, are claimed by the locals to be made by the extraterrestrials or by the extinct race of giant warriors who used it as the cannonballs or for the catapults.

On the western slopes of the mountain is the village of Zarožje, location of the famed watermill owned by Sava Savanović, the mythical, best known Serbian vampire. He was immortalized in the short story After Ninety Years by Milovan Glišić from 1880, predating Bram Stoker's Dracula by 17 years. It served as the base for Leptirica ("She-butterfly"), generally considered one of the best Serbian horror movies, made in 1973.

== Gallery ==
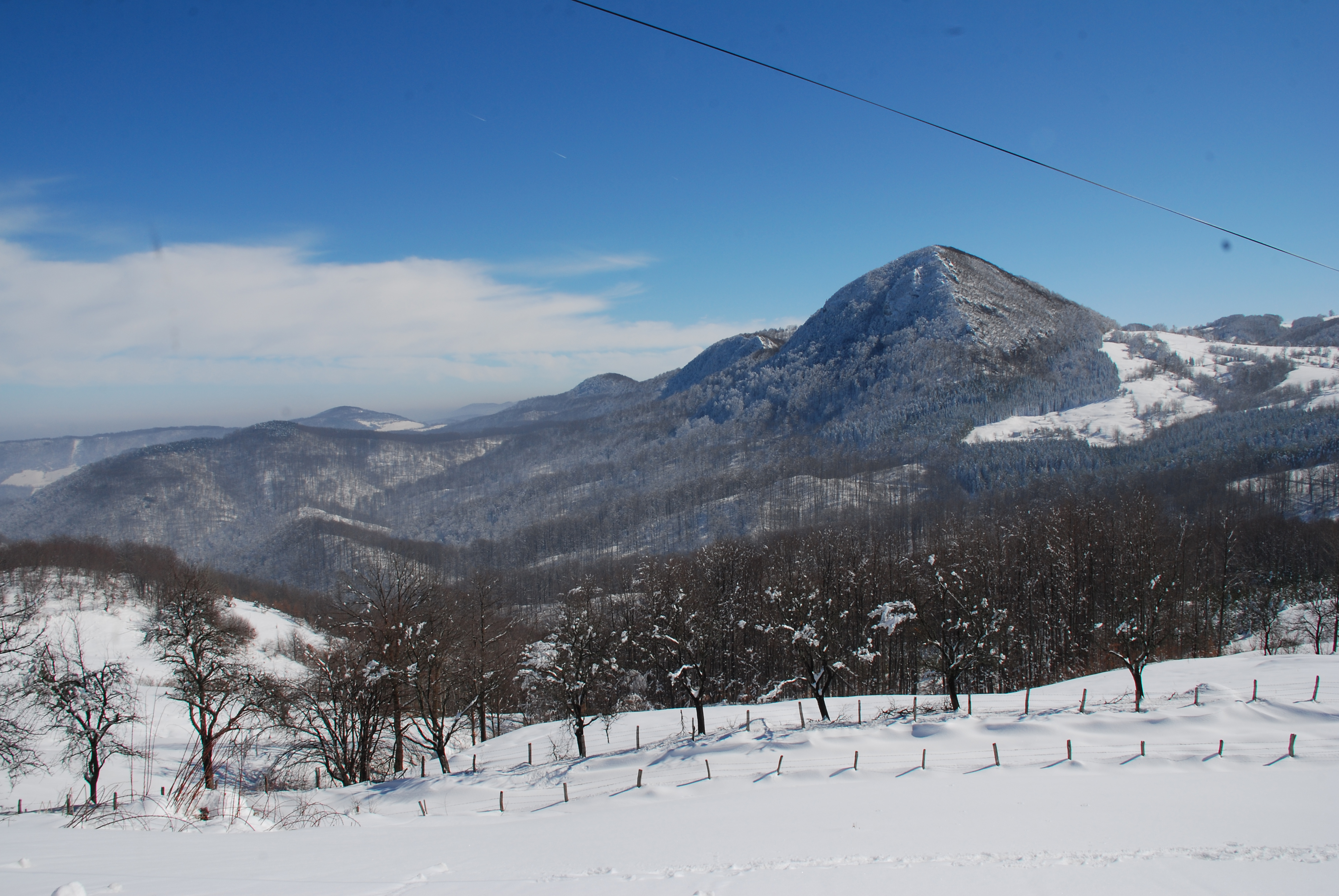

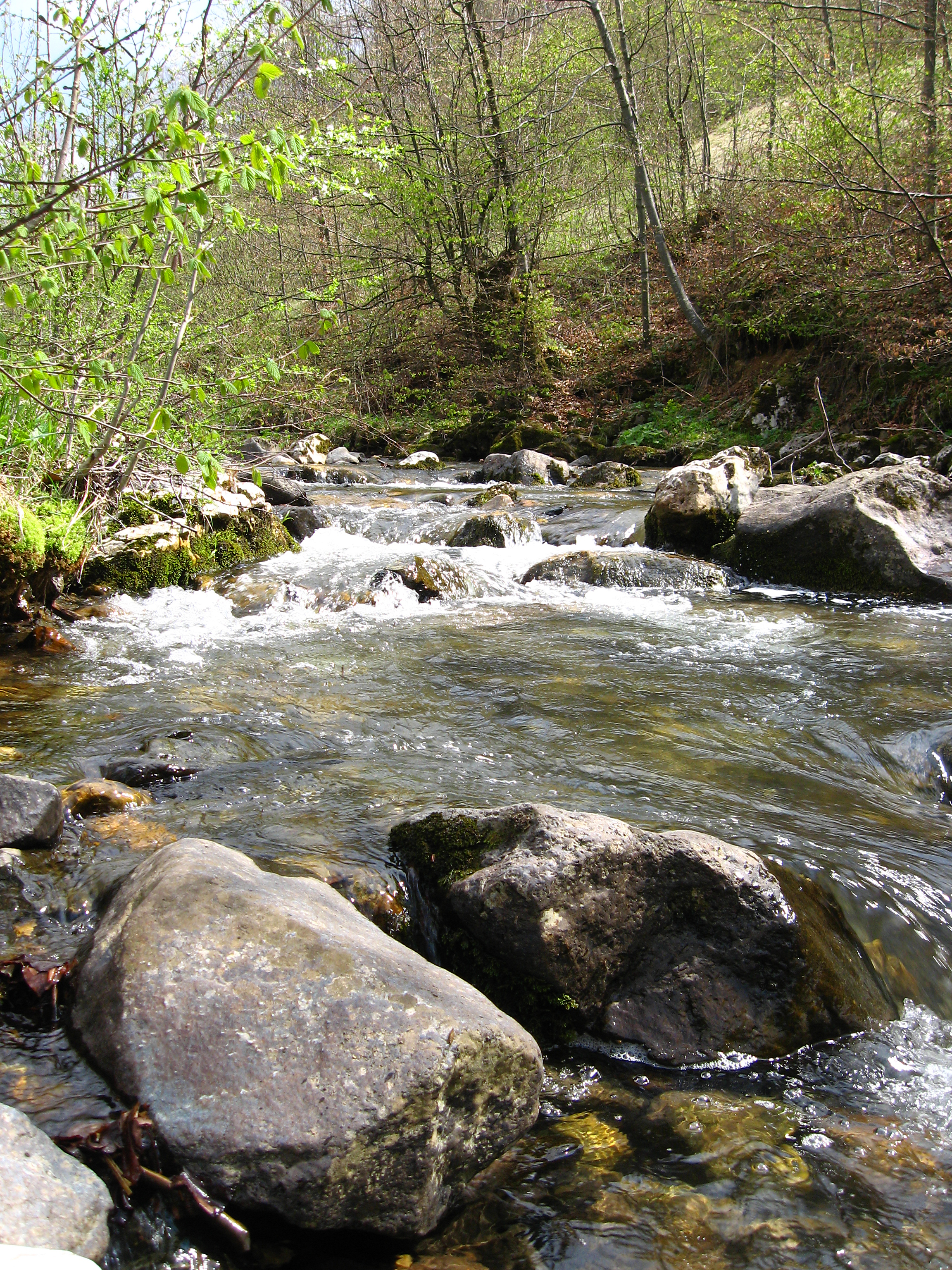

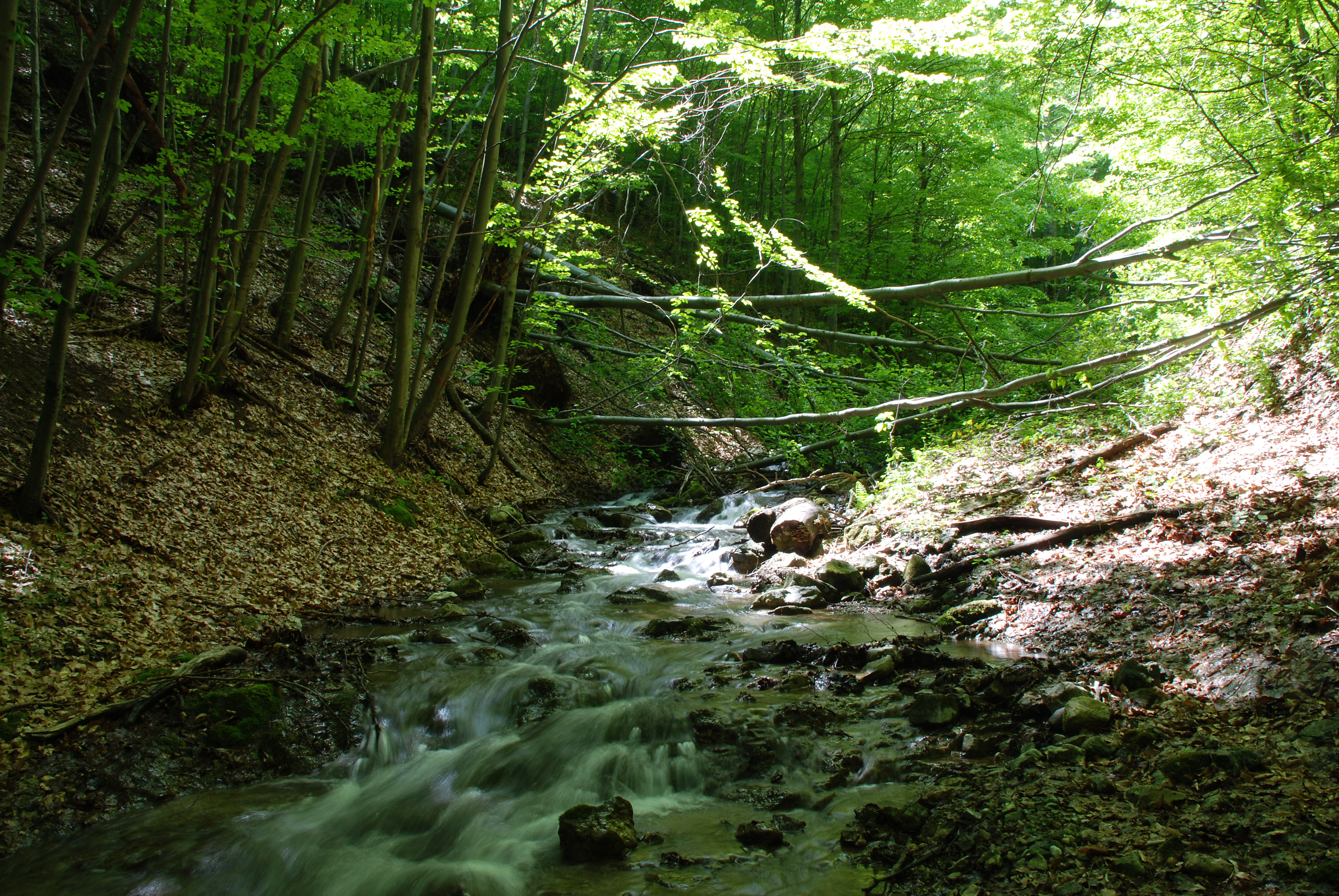

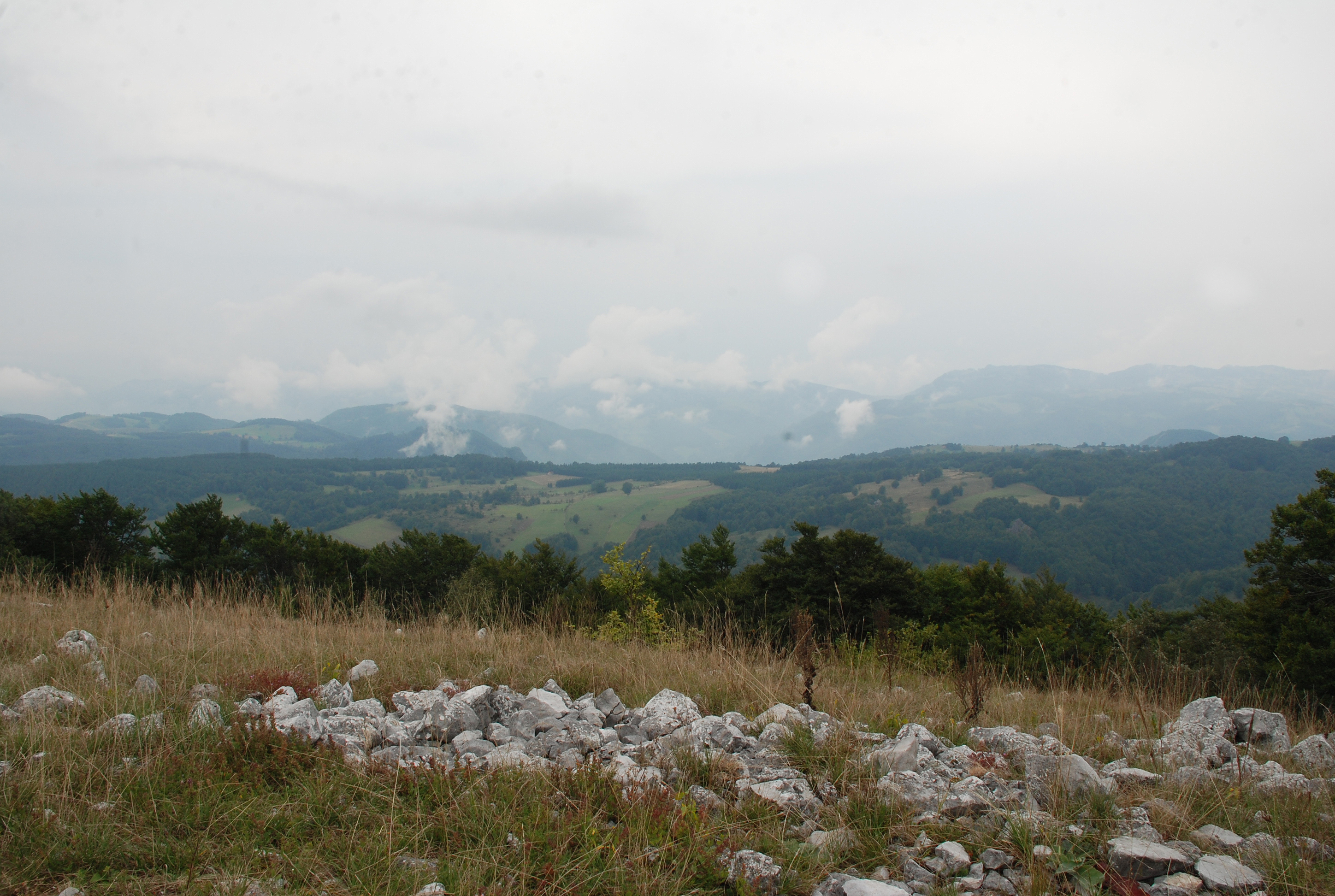

== See also ==
- List of mountains in Serbia
