= Byzantine Empire under the Constantinian and Valentinianic dynasties =

Roman Empire: Βασιλεία Ῥωμαίων (Ancient Greek); Imperium Romanum (Latin)
- 324–379
- Labarum of Constantine I^{a} Chi Rho (see Byzantine insignia)

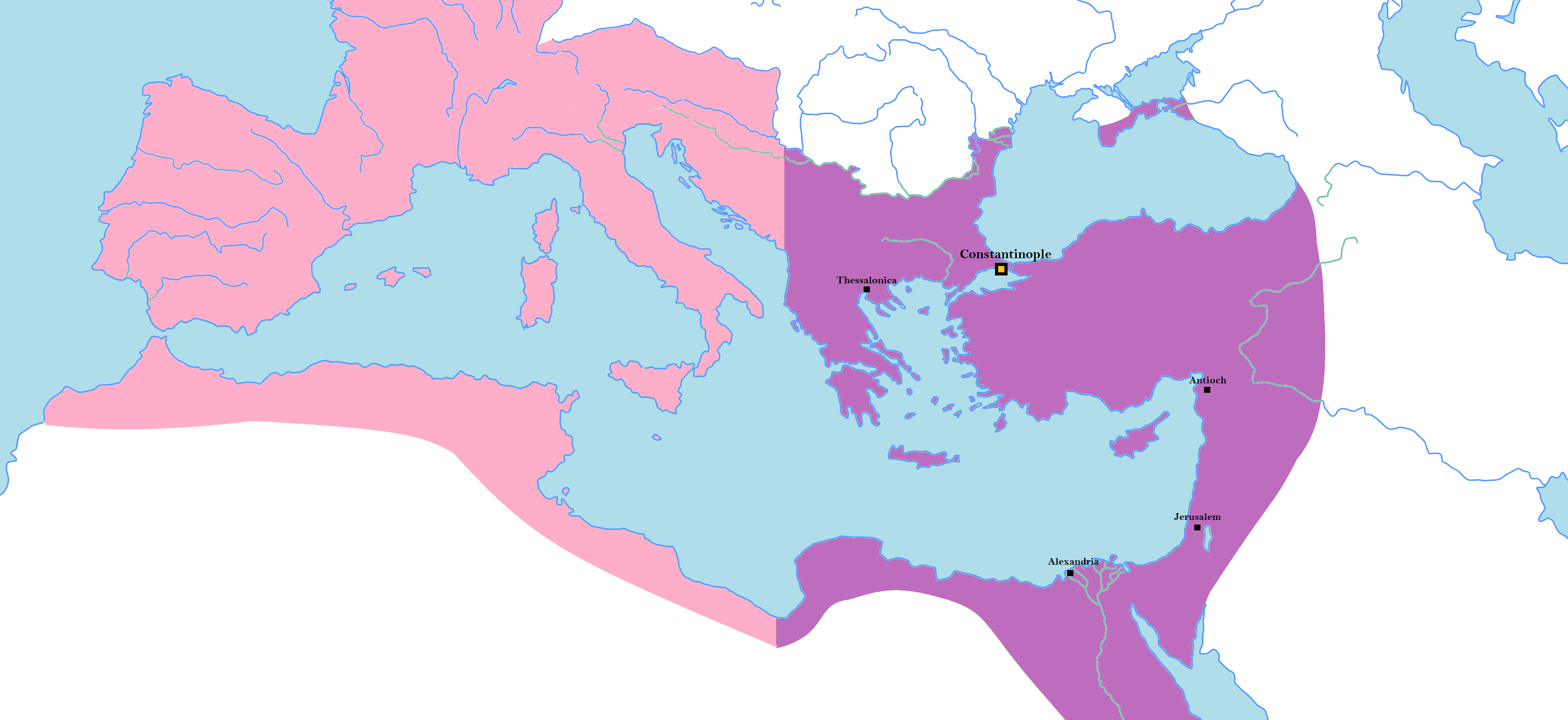
- The territory of the Eastern Roman Empire, with the Western Roman Empire depicted in pink.
- Capital: Constantinople
- Common languages: Latin, Greek
- Demonym: Roman
- Government: Monarchy
- Emperor
  - 324–337: Constantine I
  - 337–361: Constantius II
  - 361–363: Julian
  - 363–364: Jovian
  - 364: Valentinian I
  - 364–378: Valens
- History
  - Resignation of Licinius after the Chrysopolis and the Hellespont: 19 September 324
  - coronation of Theodosius I as Emperor of the East: 19 January 379
Preceded by	Succeeded by
Roman Tetrarchy	Byzantine Empire under the Theodosian dynasty
- 1. Reconstructed from the depiction on a follis minted c. 337. The three dots represent "medallions" which are said to have shown portraits of Constantine and his sons.

The Eastern Roman Empire under the Constantinian and Valentinian dynasties was the earliest period of the Byzantine history that saw a shift in government from Rome in the West to Constantinople in the East within the Roman Empire under emperor Constantine the Great and his successors. Constantinople, formally named Nova Roma, was founded in the city of Byzantium (Ancient Greek: Βυζάντιον, romanized: Byzántion), which is the origin of the historiographical name for the Eastern Empire, which self-identified simply as the "Roman Empire".

== Prelude to the creation of the Byzantine Empire ==
=== Economic strife ===
In the 3rd century, the Roman Empire suffered troubling economic difficulties that spread over a wide portion of its provinces. Drastic decreases in population throughout the western parts of the empire, along with a general degradation of society within the cities, exacerbated the crisis leading to a shortage of labor. The latifundia, or great estates, added to the troubles by forcing many of the smaller estates out of the market, which bled more labor from the labor force in order to sustain their estates. In the East, although there was a labor shortage, the population problem was not nearly as acute, rendering it stronger and more able to withstand a serious crisis. The West, in its reaction to the economic hardships that resulted in very high prices, had gone to a barter system to survive. In contrast, the East had chosen to depend upon gold coinage for the most part, creating a very reliable means by which to sustain itself.

=== Administrative reforms ===
The Roman Emperors Diocletian and Constantine I both played an important role in reforming the organization of the whole empire. The empire in its entirety had become difficult to control, and Diocletian resolved this by creating a Tetrarchy that allowed for augusti to rule in each of the western and eastern halves of the empire, while two caesars would be their seconds. In case of the loss of either augusti, the caesar would take their place, and a new caesar would be selected. The only significant change made by Constantine to this system was the replacement of the selection of caesars with a succession by bloodline.

To alleviate the concerns of territorial administration, Diocletian divided the whole of the empire into one hundred distinct provinces. Administrative control was brought under the auspices of the emperor, and the whole of Italia was relegated to the status of a regular province, now also compelled to pay taxes. Each province was assigned to a diocese, twelve in total. Constantine organized the provinces even further by creating prefectures, each one consisting of several dioceses, and each diocese consisting of several provinces. The Praetorian prefecture of the East (Praefectura praetorio per Orientem) was made up of five dioceses- Aegyptus, Oriens, Pontus, Asiana, and Thracia. This enabled the empire to harness the control of each prefecture by providing a distinct difference between military and civil administration.

=== Military threats and the division of the empire ===
Focus from the West to the East had been shifting over the course of the 2nd century because of economic strength of the usage of gold coinage and a stronger populace. The defensive situation under Diocletian, however, had changed considerably in the East. The Persian Sassanids had grown more menacing in their quest for previous territory, and the barbarians were becoming a more serious problem along the lower part of the Danube. Judging the threats to be of dire importance, Diocletian took up residence in Nicomedia, where he established his capital there, leaving Maximian, his co-emperor, in charge of the West.

== Constantine I, 324–337 ==
Constantine was acclaimed as emperor by the army at Eboracum (modern-day York) after his father's death in 306, and he emerged victorious in a series of civil wars against Emperors Maxentius and Licinius to become sole ruler of both West and East by 324. The age of Constantine marked a distinct epoch in the history of the Roman Empire. He built a new imperial residence at Byzantium and renamed the city Constantinople after himself. This marks the beginning of Byzantine history.

As emperor, Constantine enacted administrative, financial, social, and military reforms to strengthen the empire. He restructured the government, separating civil and military authorities. To combat inflation he introduced the solidus, a gold coin that became the standard for Byzantine and European currencies for more than a thousand years. The Roman army was reorganised to consist of mobile field units and garrison soldiers capable of countering internal threats and barbarian invasions. Constantine pursued successful campaigns against the tribes on the Roman frontiers—the Franks, the Alemanni, the Goths, and the Sarmatians—even resettling territories abandoned by his predecessors during the Crisis of the Third Century.

Constantine was the first Roman emperor to convert to Christianity. He called the First Council of Nicaea in 325 that produced the statement of Christian belief known as the Nicene Creed. The Church of the Holy Sepulchre was built on his orders at the purported site of Jesus' tomb in Jerusalem and became the holiest place in Christendom.

== Constantius II, 337–361 ==
Constantius II was the second son of Constantine I and Fausta. He ascended to the throne with his brothers Constantine II and Constans upon their father's death. In 340, Constantius' brothers clashed over the western provinces of the empire. The resulting conflict left Constantine II dead and Constans as ruler of the west until he was overthrown and assassinated in 350 by the usurper Magnentius. Unwilling to accept Magnentius as co-ruler, Constantius defeated him at the battles of Mursa Major and Mons Seleucus. Magnentius committed suicide after the latter battle, leaving Constantius as sole ruler of the empire.

His subsequent military campaigns against Germanic tribes were successful: he defeated the Alemanni in 354 and campaigned across the Danube against the Quadi and Sarmatians in 357. In contrast, the war in the east against the Sassanids continued with mixed results. In 351, having difficulty managing the empire alone, Constantius elevated his cousin Constantius Gallus to the subordinate rank of caesar, but had him executed three years later after receiving scathing reports of his violent and corrupt nature. Shortly thereafter, in 355, Constantius promoted his last surviving cousin, Gallus' younger half-brother, Julian, to the rank of caesar. However, Julian claimed the rank of Augustus in 360, leading to war between the two. Ultimately, no battle was fought as Constantius became ill and died late in 361, though not before naming Julian as his successor.

== Julian, 361–363 ==
In 363, Julian embarked on an ambitious campaign against the Sassanid Empire. The campaign was initially successful, securing a victory outside Ctesiphon, but later the Persians flooded the area behind him and Julian took a risky decision to withdraw up the valley of the Tigris River, and eventually during a skirmish Julian was mortally wounded, leaving his army trapped in Persian territory. Following his death, the Roman forces were obliged to cede territory in order to escape, including the fortress city of Nisibis.

Julian was a man of unusually complex character: he was "the military commander, the theosophist, the social reformer, and the man of letters". He was the last non-Christian ruler of the Roman Empire, and he believed that it was necessary to restore the empire's ancient Roman values and traditions in order to save it from dissolution. He purged the top-heavy state bureaucracy and attempted to revive traditional Roman religious practices at the expense of Christianity. Julian also forbade the Christians from teaching classical texts and learning. His rejection of Christianity and his promotion of Neoplatonic Hellenism in its place caused him to be remembered as Julian the Apostate by the church.

== Jovian, 363–364 ==
Upon the death of Julian during his campaign against the Sassanid Empire, Jovian was hastily declared emperor by his soldiers. He sought peace with the Persians on humiliating terms and reestablished Christianity as the state church of the Roman Empire. His reign lasted only eight months.

== Valens, 364–378 ==
Valens was given the eastern half of the empire by his brother Valentinian I after the latter's accession to the throne. Valens was defeated and killed in the Battle of Adrianople, which marked the beginning of the collapse of the Western Roman Empire.

"Valens was utterly undistinguished, still only a protector, and possessed no military ability: he betrayed his consciousness of inferiority by his nervous suspicion of plots and savage punishment of alleged traitors," writes A.H.M. Jones. But Jones admits that "he was a conscientious administrator, careful of the interests of the humble. Like his brother, he was an earnest Christian." He diminished the oppressive burden of the taxes which had been instituted by Constantine and his sons, and was humbly deferential to his brother in the latter's edicts of reform, as the institution of Defensors (a sort of substitute for the ancient Tribunes, guardians of the lower classes).

== Emperors ==
- Constantine I
- Constantius II
- Julian the Apostate
- Jovian
- Valens

== Timeline ==
- Red denotes Eastern (or sole) Emperors
- Pink denotes Western Emperors
- Orange denotes Eastern Caesars
- Yellow denotes Western Caesars

== See also ==
- Family tree of Byzantine emperors
