= Skrapež =

Skrapež Скрапеж (Serbian)
- Village
- Location within Serbia
- Coordinates: 43°2′N 22°6′E
- Country: Serbia
- District: Jablanica District
- Municipality: Vlasotince

Population (2002)
  - Total: 215
- Time zone: UTC+1 (CET)
  - Summer (DST): UTC+2 (CEST)

Skrapež is a village in the municipality of Vlasotince, Serbia. According to the 2002 census, the village has a population of 215 people.
