= Medvednik =

Mountain in Serbia

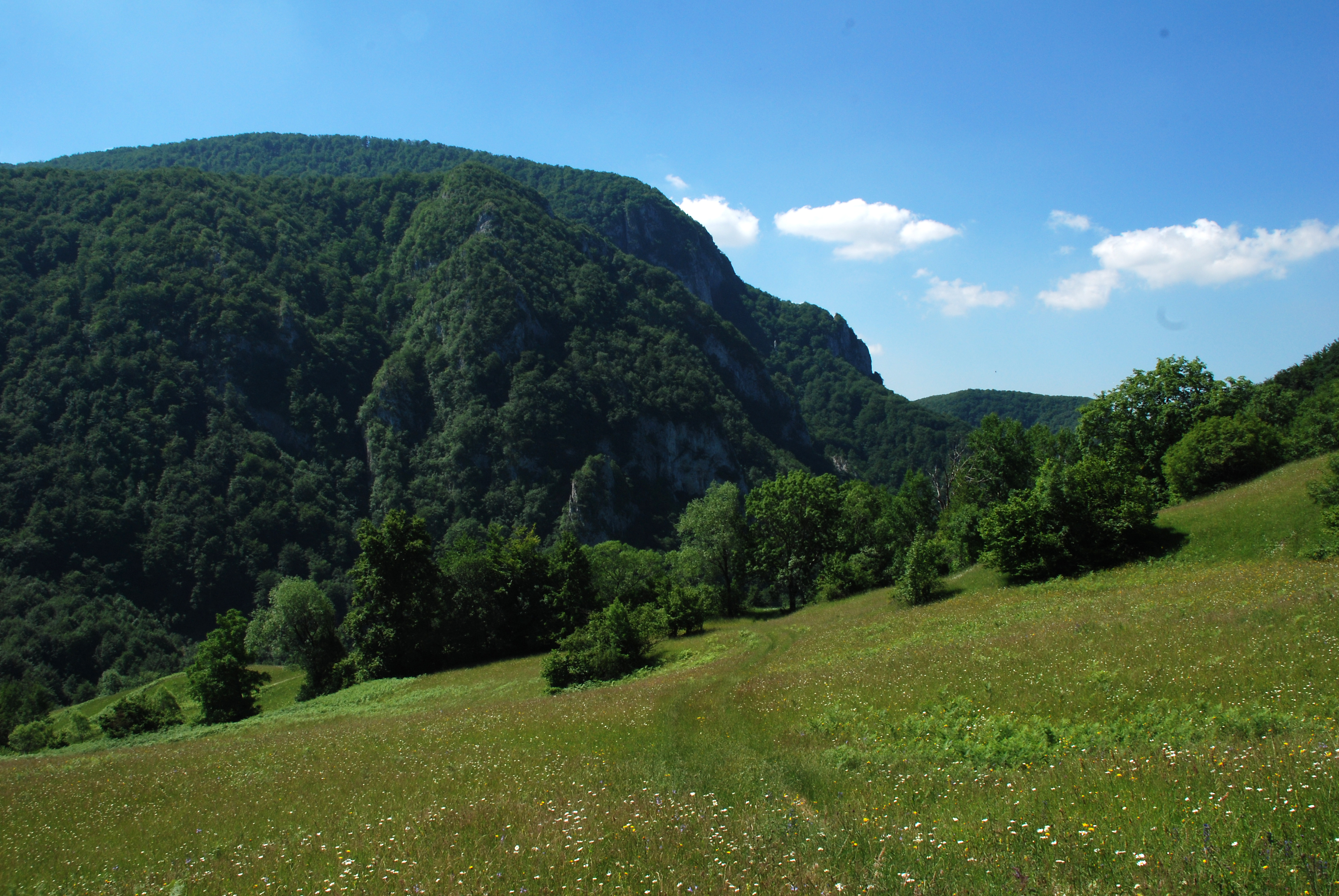

Highest point
- Elevation: 1,247 m (4,091 ft)
- Coordinates: 44°12′38″N 19°38′11″E

Geography
- Location within Serbia
- Location: Western Serbia
- Parent range: Dinaric Alps

Medvednik (Serbian Cyrillic: Медведник) is a mountain in western Serbia, near the town of Valjevo. Its highest peak has an elevation of 1,247 meters above sea level.

== Gallery ==
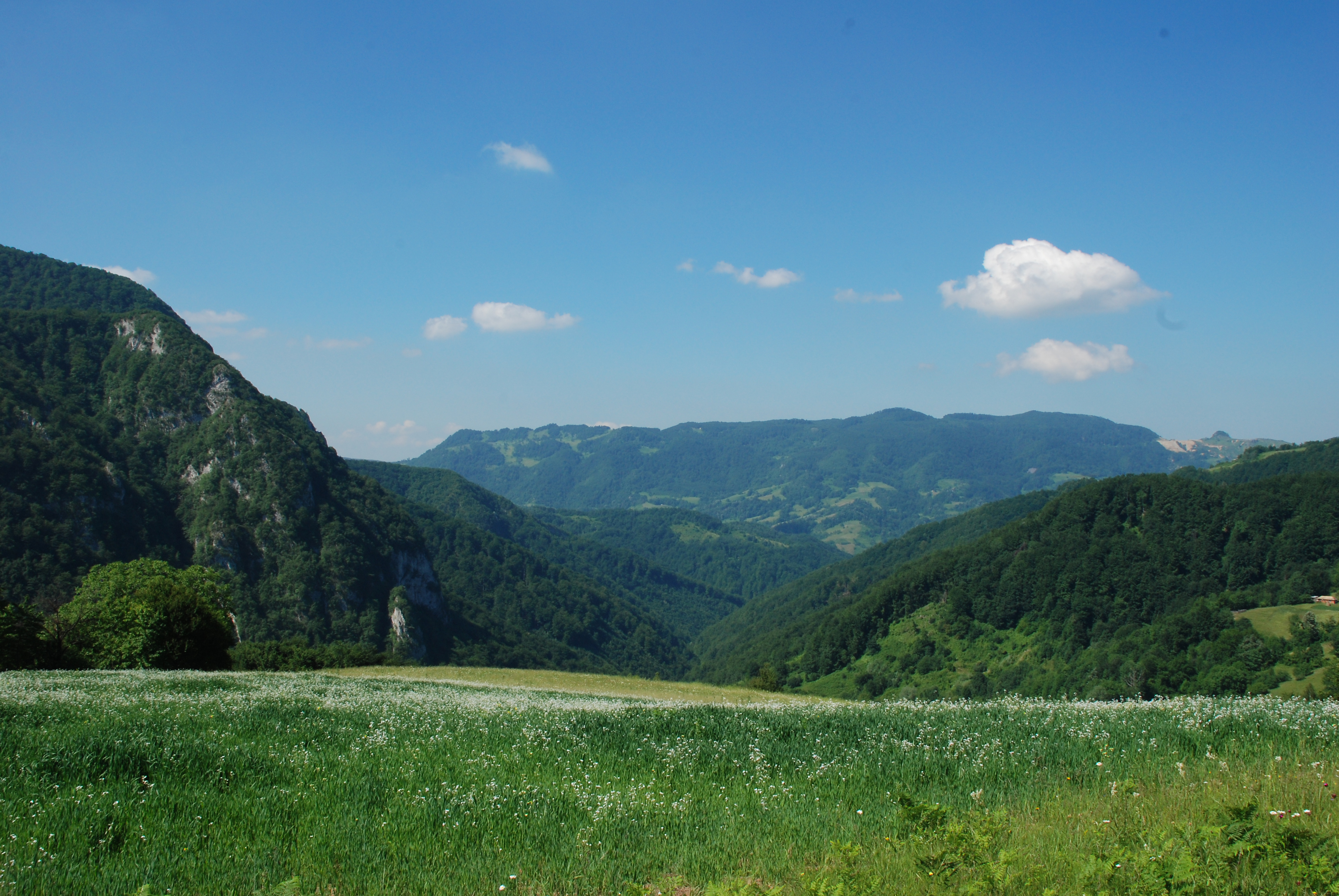

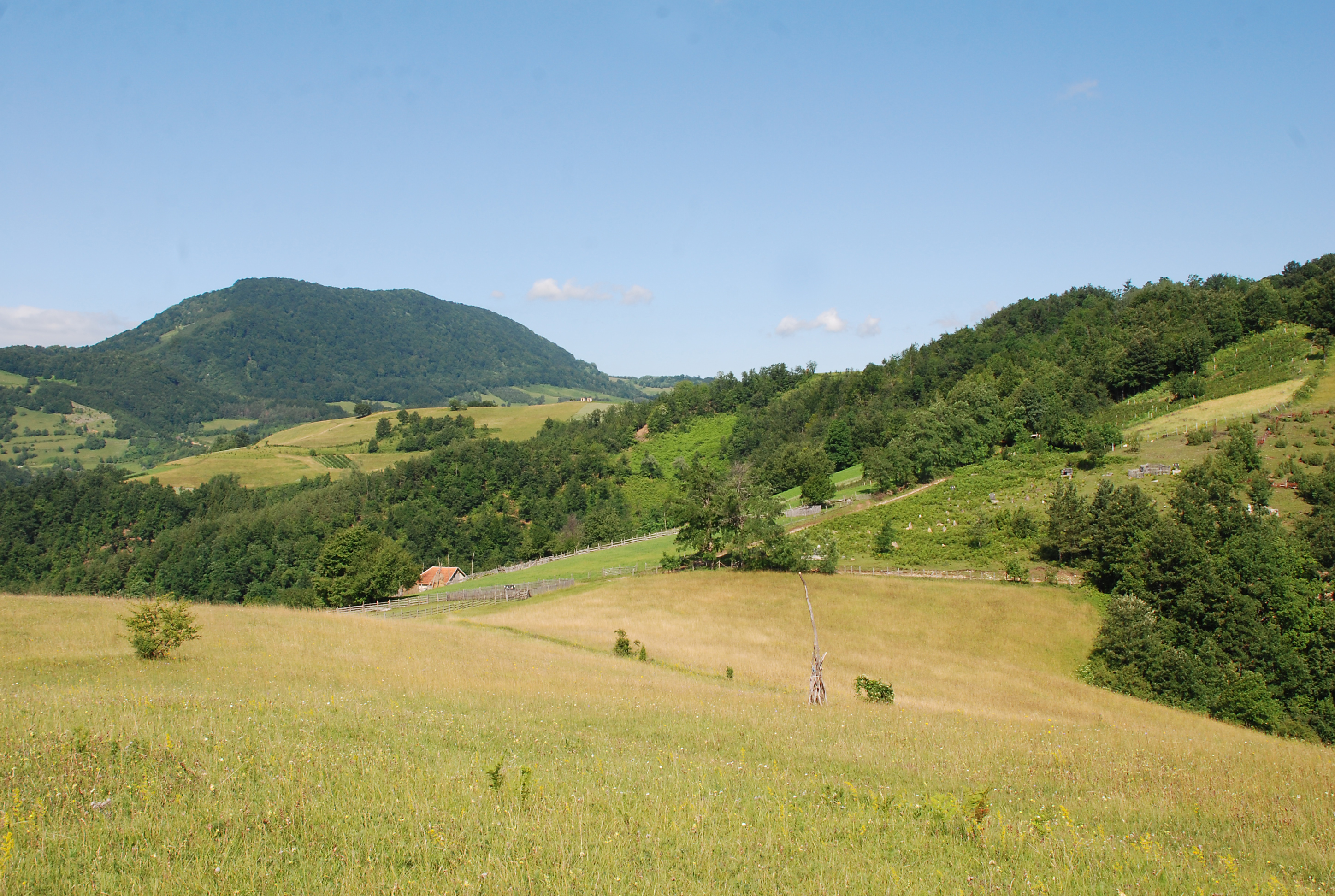

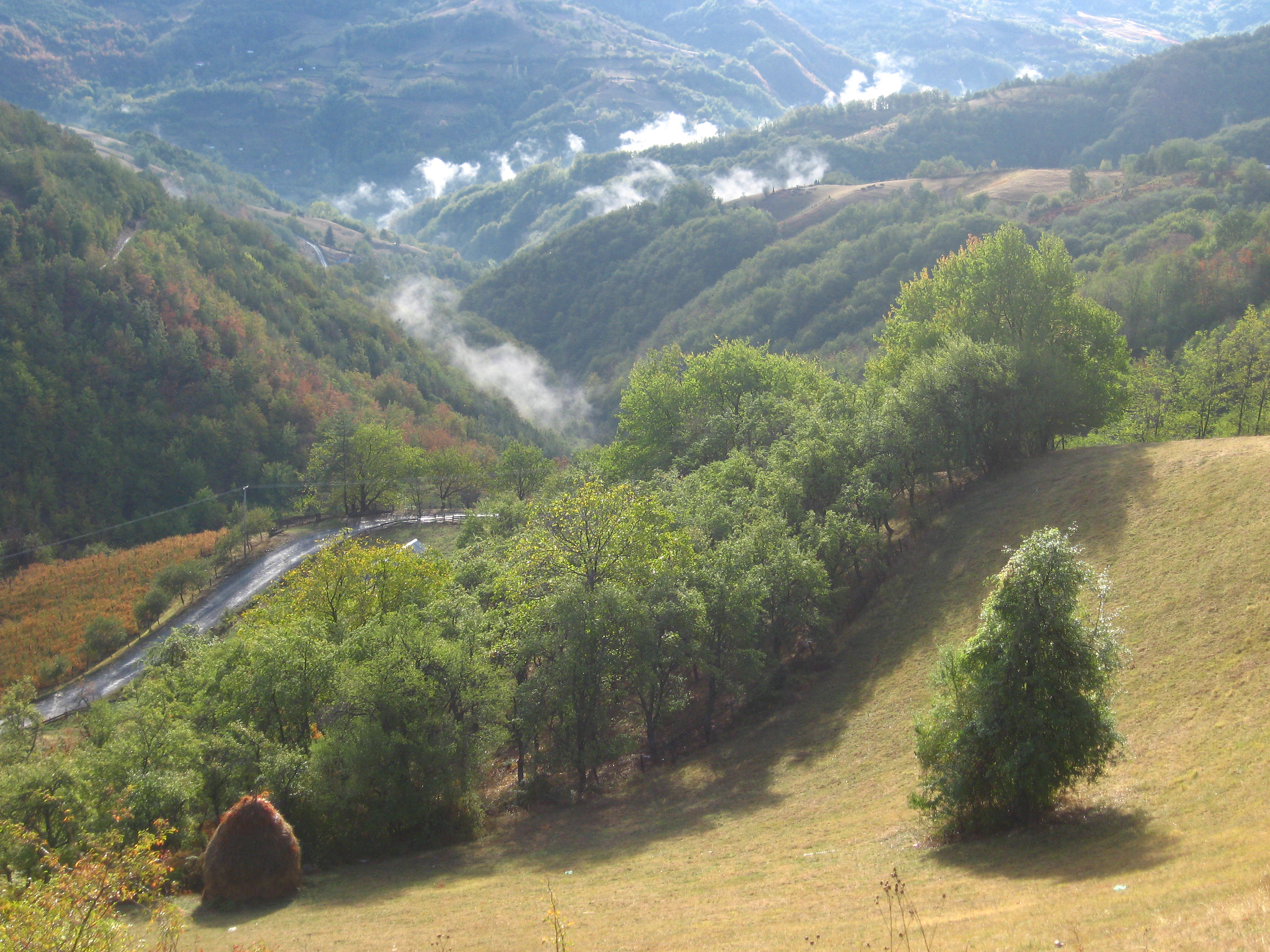

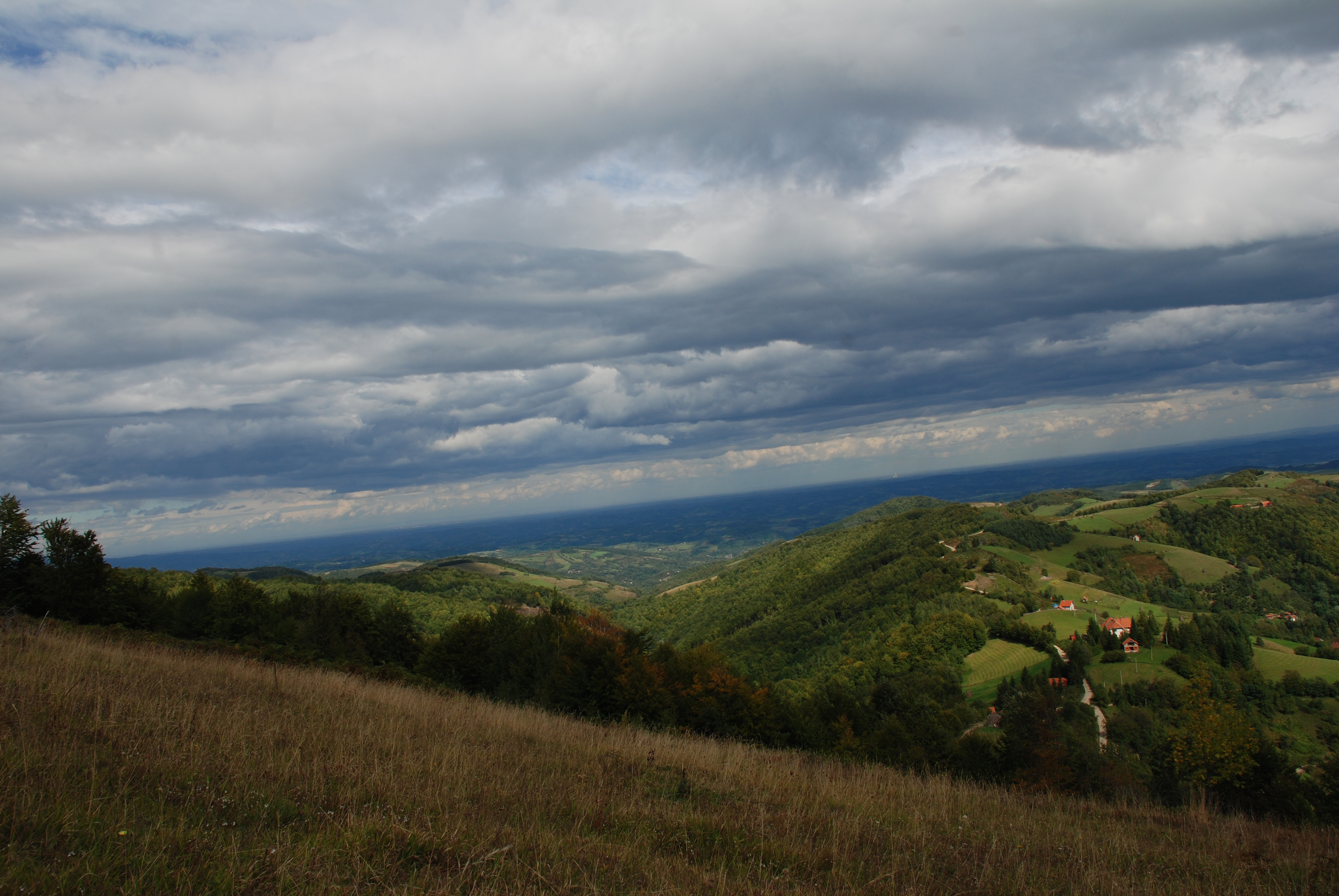

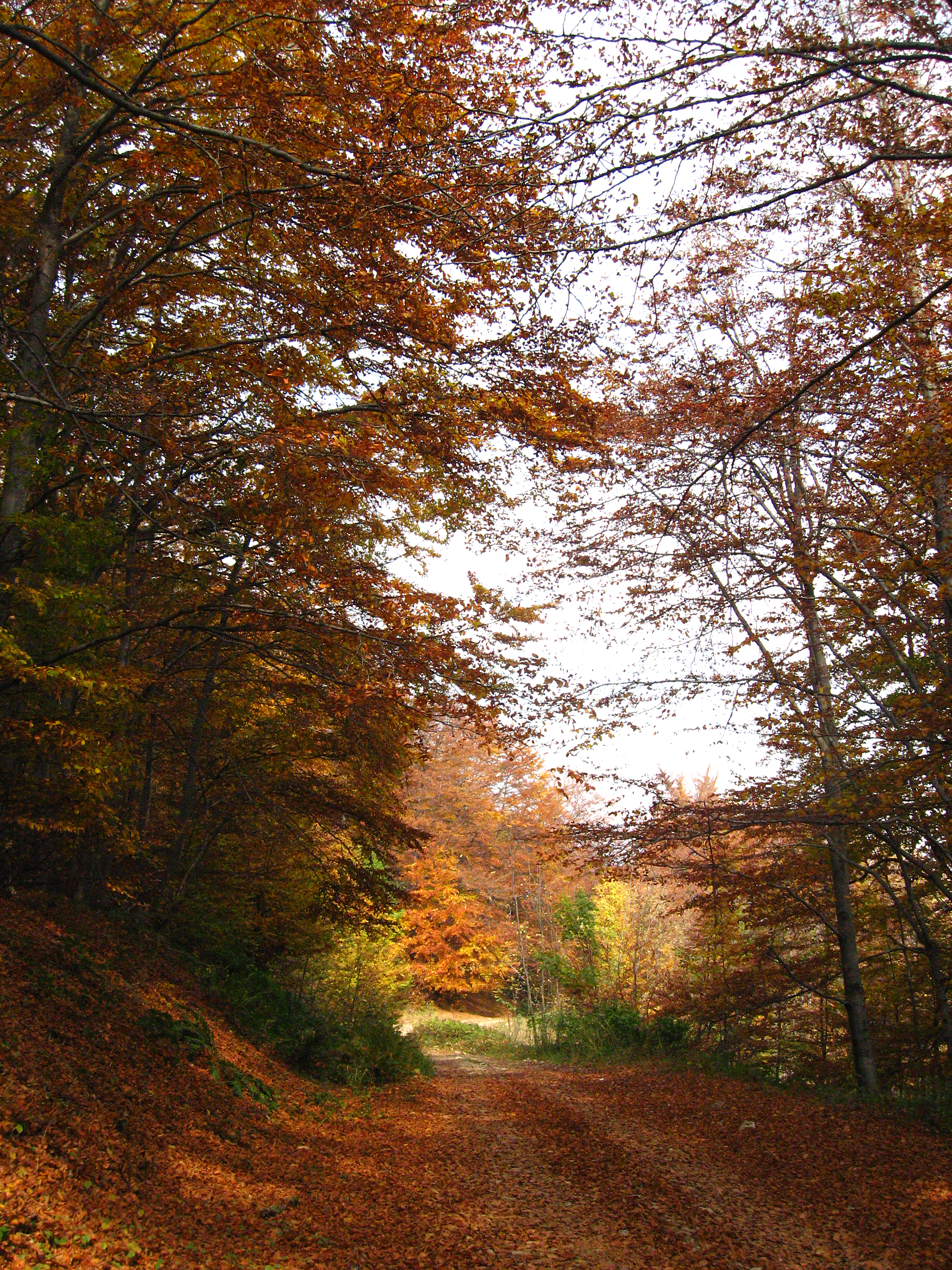

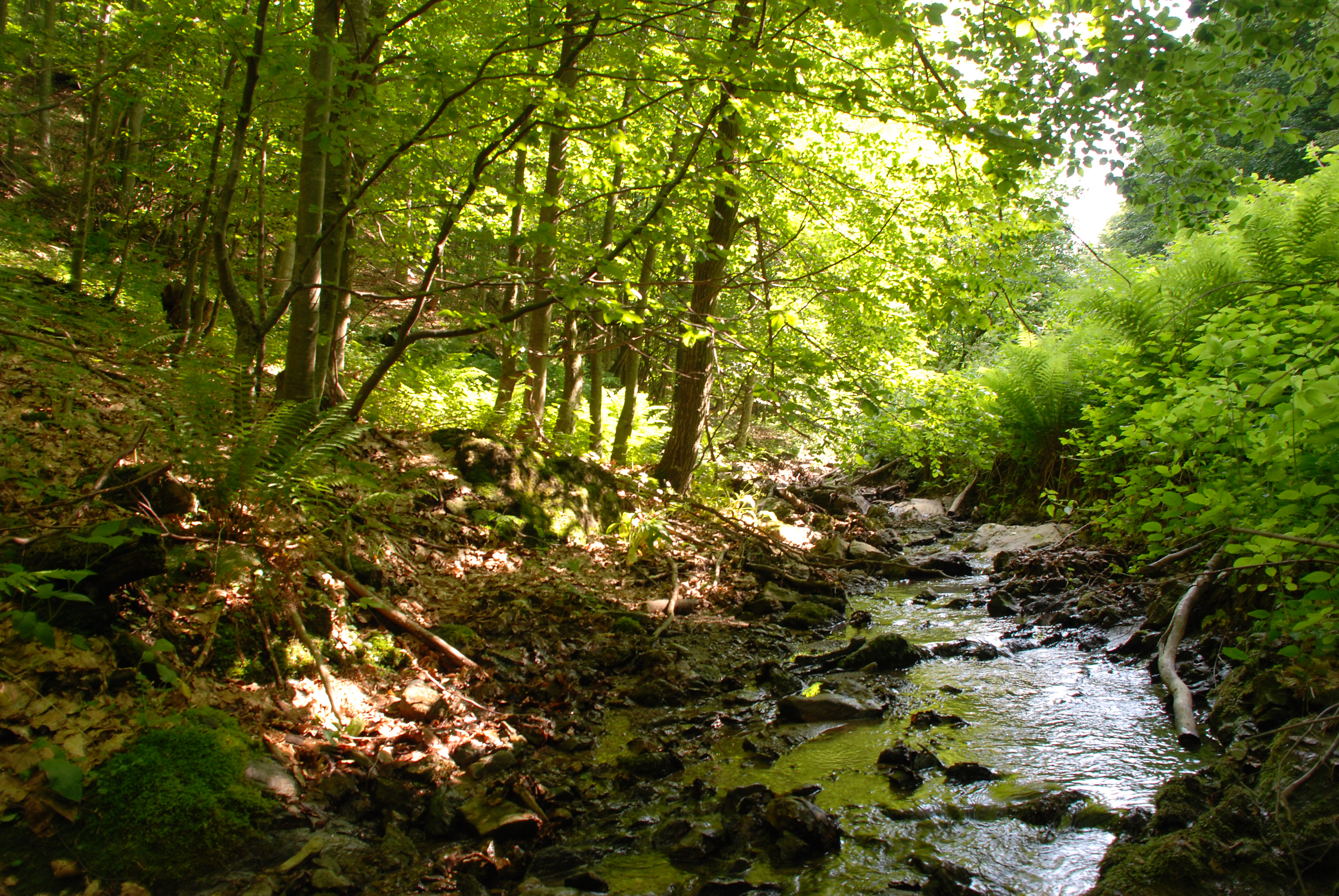

== See also ==
- List of mountains in Serbia
