= Debelo Brdo (mountain pass) =

Mountain pass in Serbia

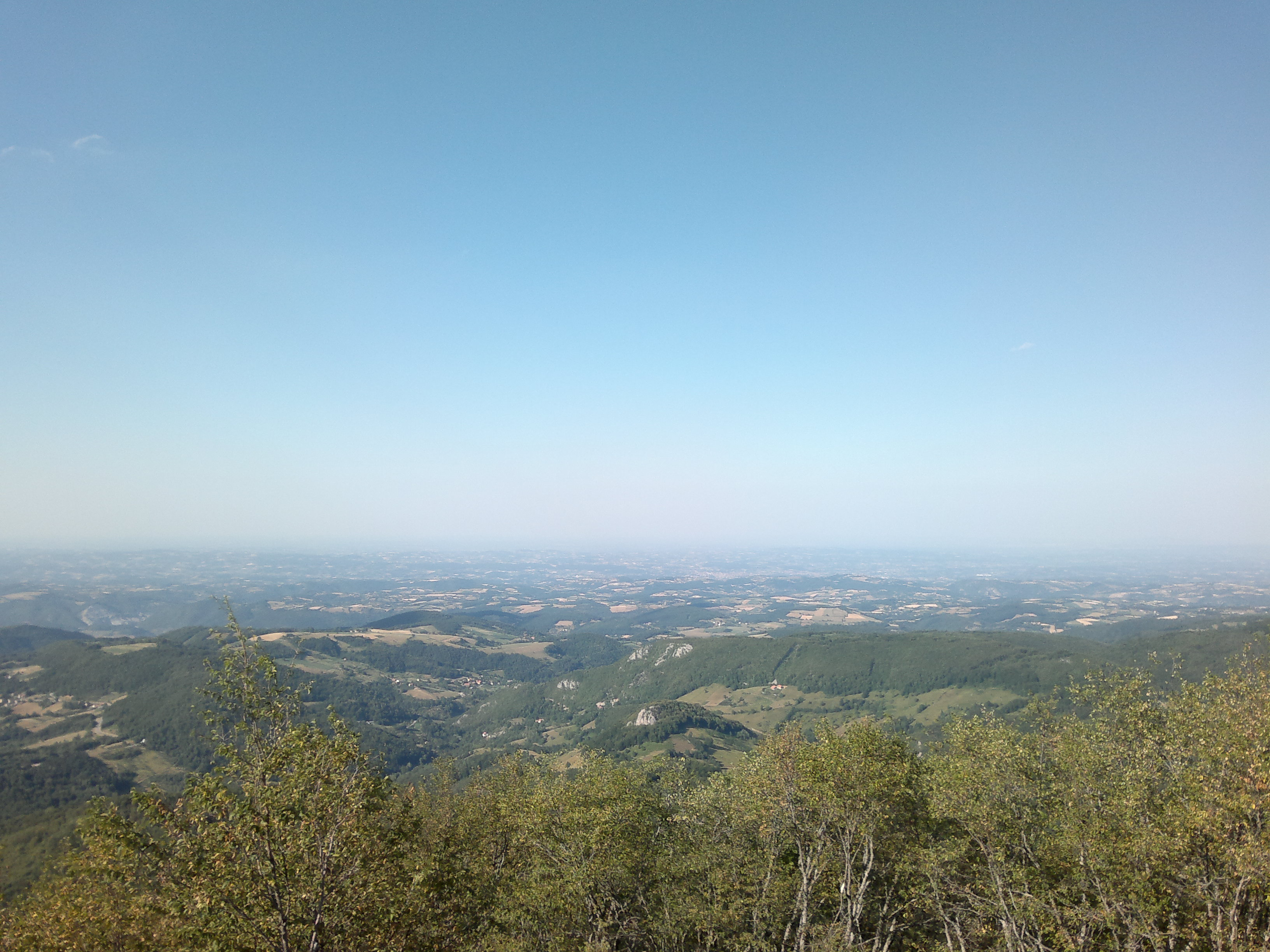
- View from Povlen

Highest point
- Elevation: 1,094 m (3,589 ft)
- Coordinates: 44°09′01″N 19°41′28″E

Geography
- Location within Serbia
- Location: Western Serbia
- Parent range: Dinaric Alps

Debelo Brdo (Cyrillic: Дебело брдо) is a mountain pass of Povlen mountain in western Serbia, to the south of the city of Valjevo. Its highest part Vinčine vode has an elevation of 1,094 m (3,589 ft) above sea level.

== See also ==
- List of mountains in Serbia
