= Dinaric Alps =

Mountain range in the Balkan Peninsula of Southeastern Europe

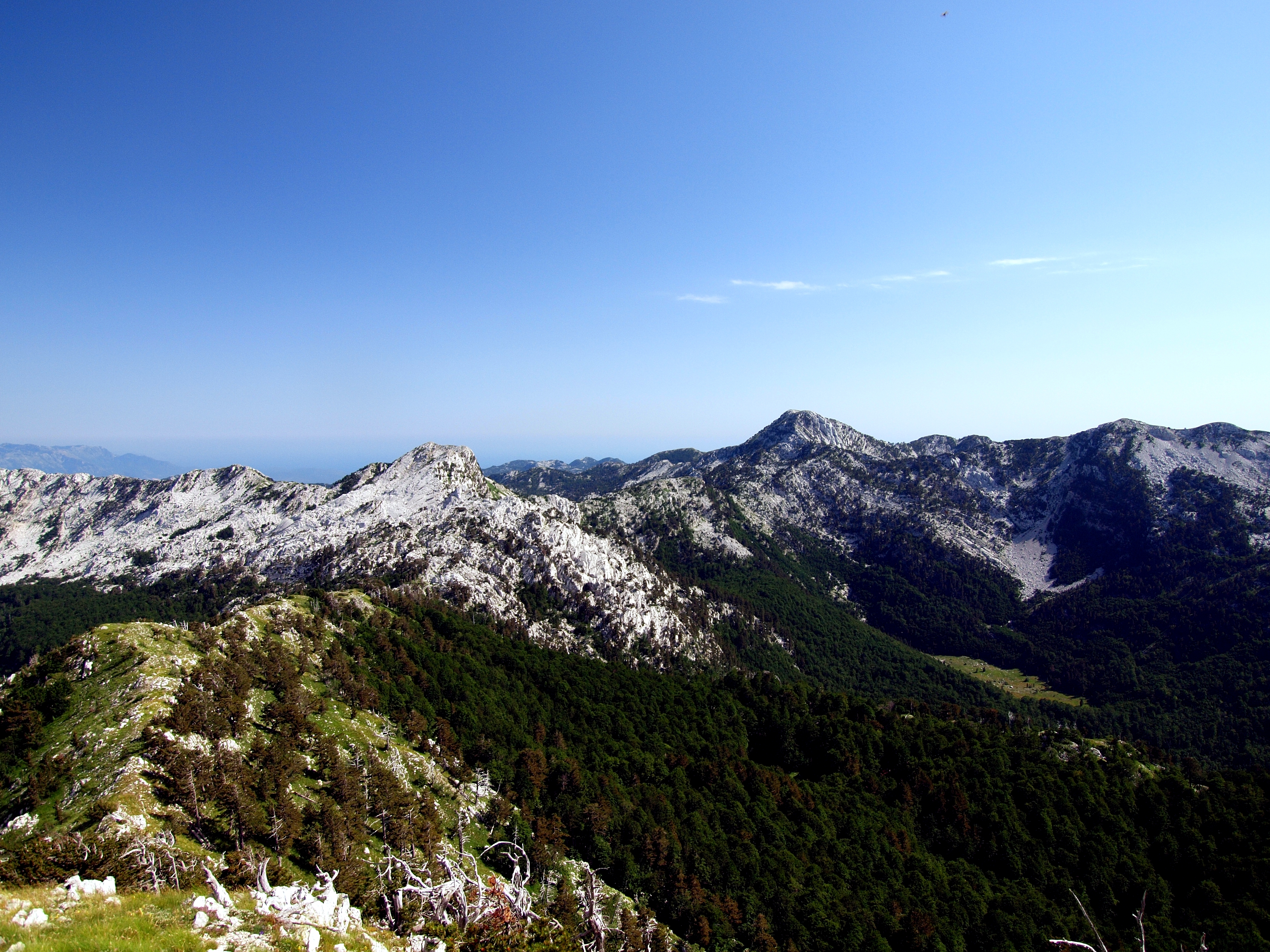
- Orjen spreads between Bosnia and Herzegovina and Montenegro and is the most heavily karstified range of the Dinarides.

Highest point
- Peak: Maja Jezercë in Albania
- Elevation: 2,694 m (8,839 ft)
- Coordinates: 45°N 17°E

Dimensions
- Length: 645 km (401 mi) NW-SE
- Area: 200,000 km^{2} (77,000 mi^{2})

Geography
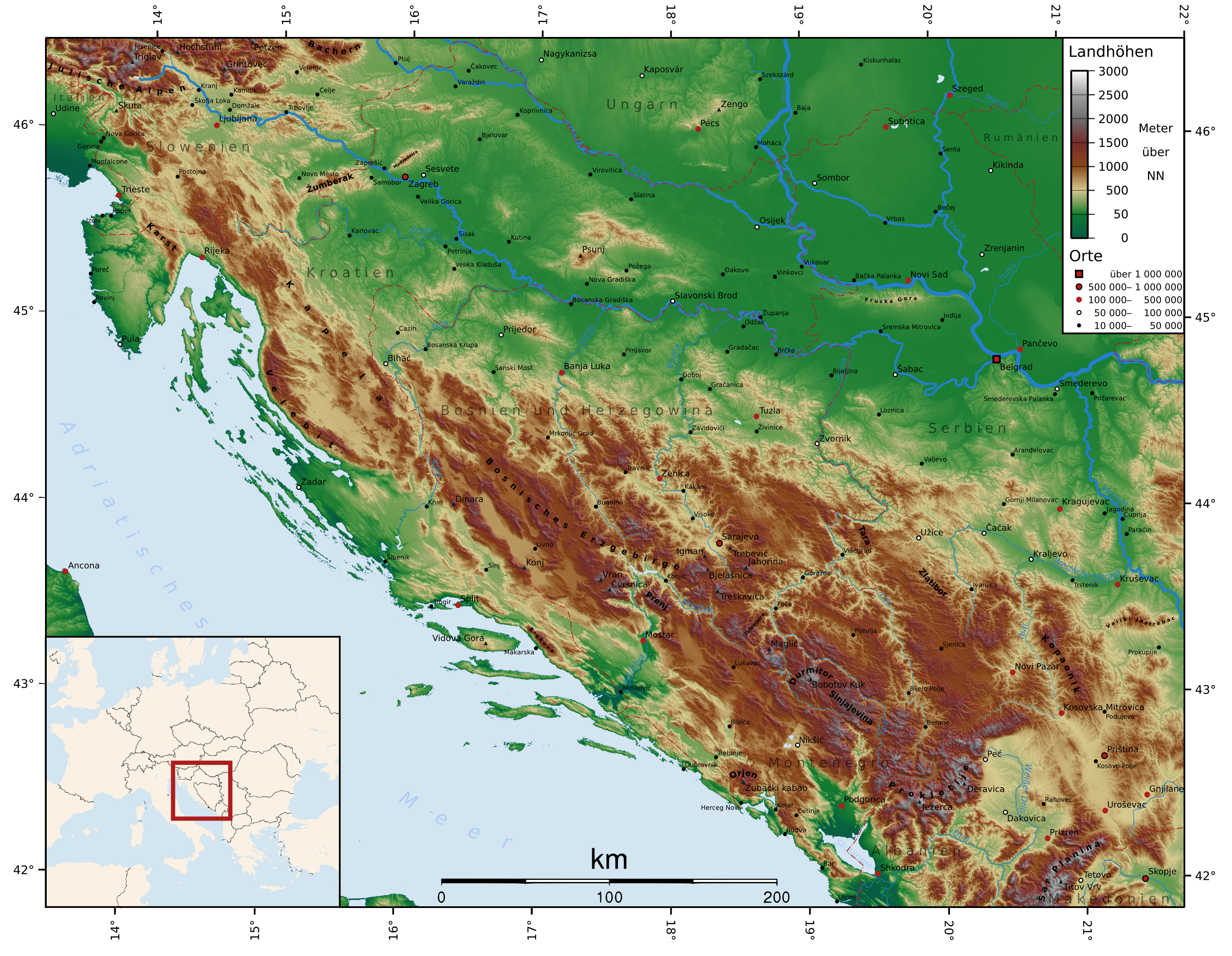
- Topography and relief of the Dinarides
- Countries: Albania; Bosnia and Herzegovina; Croatia; Italy; Montenegro; Kosovo; Serbia; Slovenia
- Borders on: Julian Alps

Geology
- Rock age: Mesozoic era
- Rock type: Sedimentary

The Dinaric Alps (/dɪˈnærɪk/), also Dinarides, are a mountain range in Southern and South-Central Europe, separating the continental Balkan Peninsula from the Adriatic Sea. They stretch from Italy in the northwest through Slovenia, Croatia, Bosnia and Herzegovina, Serbia, Montenegro, Kosovo and North Macedonia to Albania in the southeast.

The Dinaric Alps extend for approximately 645 kilometres (401 mi) along the western Balkan Peninsula from the Julian Alps of northeast Italy and northwest Slovenia, downwards to the Šar and Korab massif, where their direction changes. The Accursed Mountains are the highest section of the entire Dinaric Alps; this section stretches from Albania to Kosovo and eastern Montenegro. Maja Jezercë, standing at 2,694 metres (8,839 ft) above the Adriatic, is the highest peak and is located in Albania.

The Dinaric Alps are one of the most rugged and extensive mountainous areas of Europe, alongside the Caucasus Mountains, Alps, Pyrenees, Carpathian Mountains and Scandinavian Mountains. They are formed largely of Mesozoic and Cenozoic sedimentary rocks of dolomite, limestone, sandstone and conglomerates formed by seas and lakes that once covered the area. During the Alpine earth movements that occurred 50 to 100 million years ago, immense lateral pressures folded and overthrust the rocks in a great arc around the old rigid block of the northeast. The main tectonic phase of the orogenesis in the area of the Dinaric Karst took place in Cenozoic Era (Paleogene) as a result of the Adriatic Microplate (Adria) collision with Europe, and the process is still active. The Dinaric Alps were thrown up in more or less parallel ranges, stretching like necklaces from the Julian Alps as far as northern Albania and Kosovo, where the mountainous terrain subsides to make way for the waters of the Drin River and the plains of Kosovo.

== Name ==
The Dinarides are named after Mount Dinara, a prominent peak in the center of the mountain range on the border separating Croatia from Bosnia and Herzegovina, which reaches 1,831 metres (6,007 ft). Names of the chain in local languages include Albanian: Alpet Dinarike [alpɛt dinaɾikɛ] or Dinaret; Italian: Alpi Dinariche [alpi dinarike]; Serbo-Croatian: Динариди, Dinaridi or Динарско горје Dinarsko gorje [dìnarskòː ɡòːrjeː]; Slovene: Dinarsko gorstvo [dìnarskòː ɡòːrstvòː].

== Geology ==
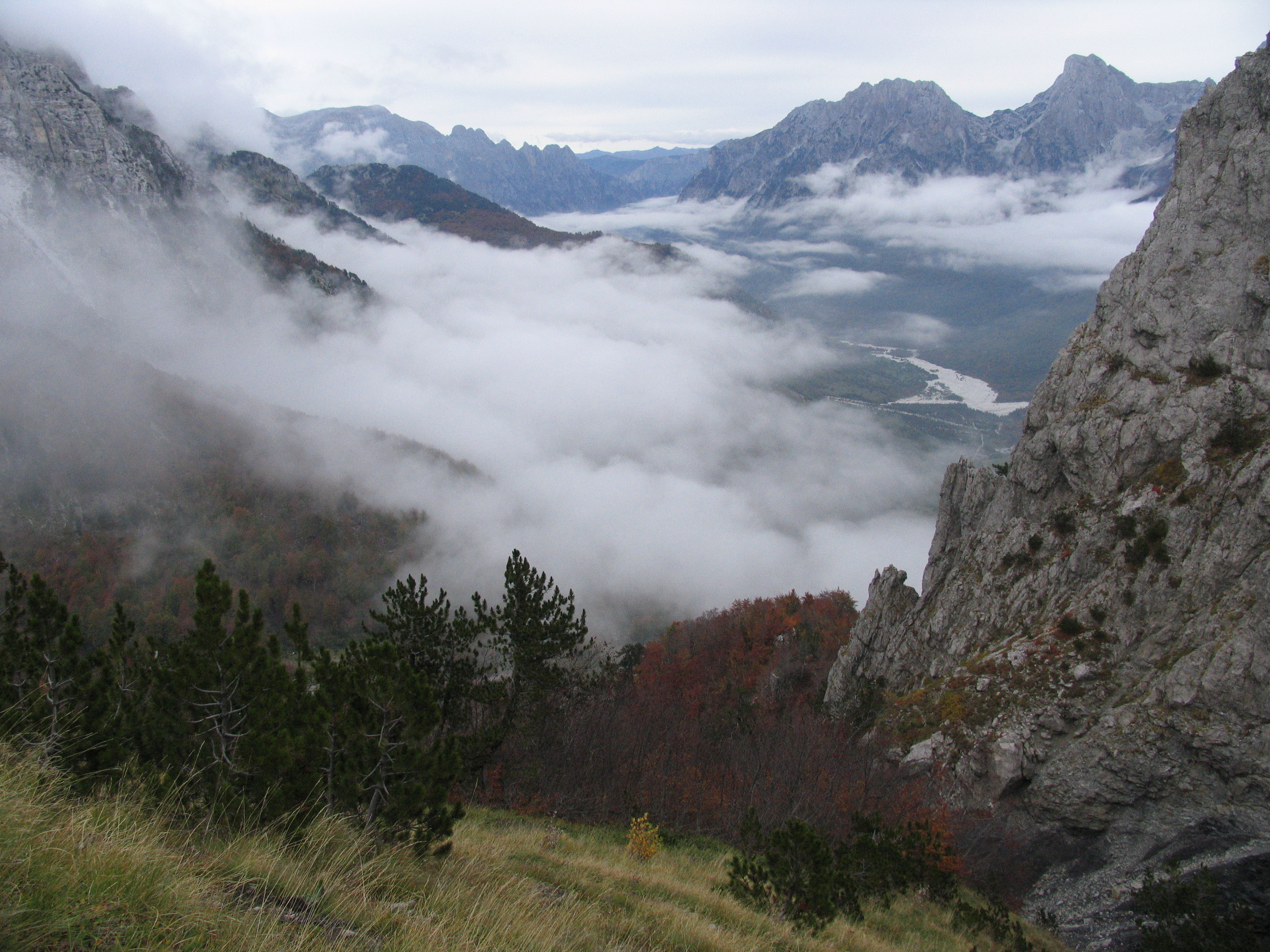
Valbona Pass, northern Albania

The Dinaric Karst region is built mostly of Mesozoic limestone and dolomite deposited on top of a huge Bahama-type carbonate platform, while a few kilometers thick carbonate successions have been deformed during the Alpine orogenesis. The main tectonic phase of the Alpine orogenesis in the Dinaric Karst region took place in the Cenozoic Era (Paleogene) as a result of the Adriatic microplate (Adria) collision with the Serbo-Macedonian and Rhodope Massifs, and the process is still active. The Mesozoic limestone forms a very distinctive region of the Balkans, notable for features such as the Karst Plateau, which has given its name to all such terrains of limestone eroded by groundwater. The Dinarides are known for being composed of karst – limestone rocks – as is Dinara, the mountain for which they were named. The Quaternary ice ages had relatively little direct geologic influence on the Balkans. No permanent ice caps existed, and there is little evidence of extensive glaciation. Only the highest summits of Durmitor, Orjen and Prenj have glacial valleys and moraines as low as 600 m (1,969 ft). However, in the Accursed Mountains (Serbo-Croatian: Prokletije), a range on the northern Albanian border that runs east to west (thus breaking the general geographic trend of the Dinaric system), there is evidence of major glaciation.

One geological feature of great importance to the present-day landscape of the Dinarides must be considered in more detail: that of the limestone mountains, often with their attendant faulting. They are hard and slow to erode, and often persist as steep jagged escarpments, through which steep-sided gorges and canyons are cleft by the rivers draining the higher slopes. Another is polje, in geological terminology, a large, flat-floored depression within karst limestone, whose long axis develops in parallel with major structural trends and can become several miles (tens of kilometers) long. Superficial deposits tend to accumulate along the floor; drainage may be either by surface watercourses (as an open polje) or by swallow holes (as a closed polje) or ponors. Usually, the ponors cannot transmit entire flood flows, so many poljes become wet-season lakes. The structure of some poljes is related to the geological structure, but others are purely the result of lateral dissolution and planation. The development of poljes is fostered by any blockage in the karst drainage.

The partially submerged western Dinaric Alps form the numerous islands and harbors along the Croatian coast.

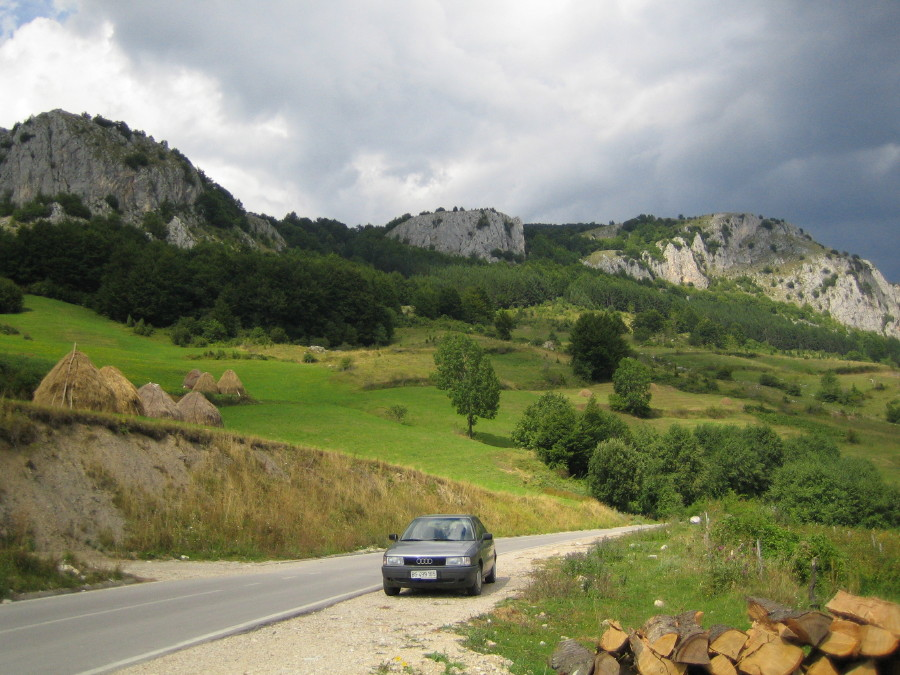
Mount Mučanj, lower Dinarides, western Serbia

=== Rivers in Dinaric karst ===
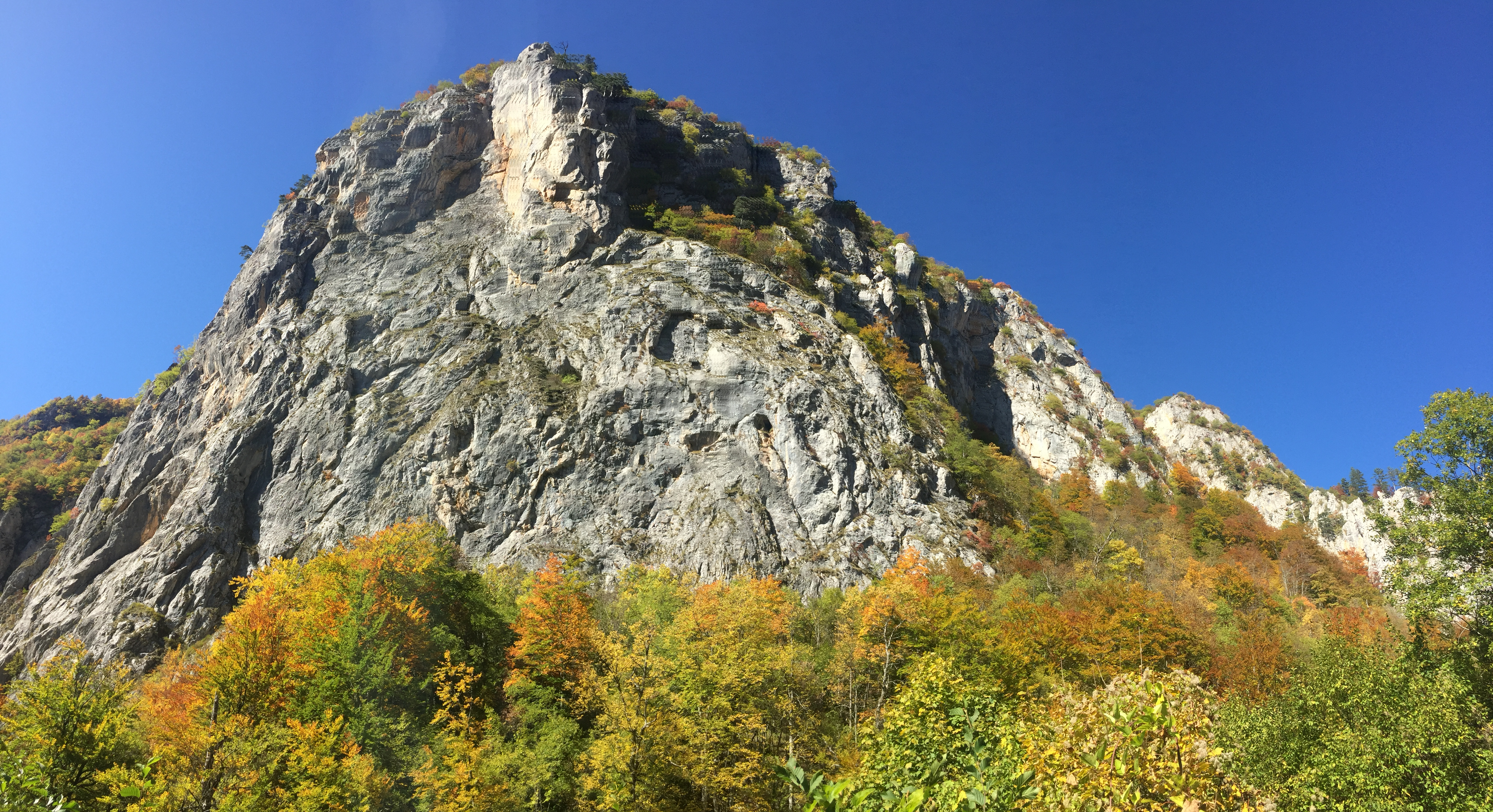
The surroundings of Foča. Bosnia and Herzegovina

The most extensive example of limestone mountains in Europe are those of the Karst of the Dinaric Alps. Here, all the characteristic features are encountered again and again as one travels through this wild and thinly populated country. Limestone is a very porous rock, yet very hard and resistant to erosion. Water is the most important corrosive force, dissolving the limestone by chemical action of its natural acidity. As it percolates down through cracks in the limestone it opens up fissures and channels, often of considerable depth, so that whole systems of underground drainage develop. During subsequent millennia these work deeper, leaving in their wake enormous waterless caverns, sinkholes and grottoes and forming underground labyrinths of channels and shafts. The roofs of some of these caverns may eventually fall in, to produce great perpendicular-sided gorges, exposing the surface to the water once more.

The Dinaric rivers carved many canyons characteristic for Dinaric Alps, and in particular karst. Among the largest and most well known are the Neretva, the Rakitnica, the Prača, the Drina, the Sutjeska, the Vrbas, the Ugar, the Piva, the Tara, the Komarnica, the Morača, the Cem/Ciijevna, the Lim, and the Drin.

Only along the Dinaric gorges is communication possible across the Karst, and roads and railways tunnel through precipitous cliffs and traverse narrow ledges above roaring torrents. A number of springs and rivers rise in the Dinaric range, including Jadro Spring noted for having been the source of water for Diocletian's Palace at Split. At the same time, the purity of these rocks is such that the rivers are crystal clear, and there is little soil-making residue. Water quality testing of the Jadro River, for example, indicates the low pollutant levels present. Rock faces are often bare of vegetation and glaring white, but what little soil there is may collect in the hollows and support lush lime-tolerant vegetation, or yield narrow strips of cultivation.

== Human activity ==
Ruins of fortresses dot the mountainous landscape, illustrating evidence of centuries of war and the refuge that the Dinaric Alps have provided to various armed forces. During the Roman period, the Dinarides provided shelter to the Illyrians resisting Roman conquest of the Balkans, which began with the conquest of the eastern Adriatic coast in the 3rd century BC. Rome conquered the whole of Illyria in 168 BC, but these mountains sheltered Illyrian resistance forces for many years until the area's complete subjugation by 14 AD. More recently, the Ottoman Empire failed to fully subjugate the mountainous areas of Montenegro. In the 20th century, too, the mountains provided favourable terrain for guerrilla warfare, with Yugoslav Partisans organising the most successful Allied resistance movements of World War II.

The area remains underpopulated, and forestry and mining remain the chief economic activities in the Dinaric Alps. The people of the Dinaric Alps are on record as being the tallest in the world, with an average male adolescent height of 185.6 cm (6 ft 1 in). The people of Bosnia and Herzegovina have the highest recorded average of any single country, with 183.9 cm (6 ft 0 in) average for men and 171.8 cm (5 ft 8 in) for women.

== Mountain passes ==
The main mountain passes of the Dinaric Alps are:

- Postojna Gate (Postojnska vrata), Slovenia (606 m or 1,988 ft),
- Vratnik pass, Croatia (700 m or 2,297 ft)
- Debelo brdo, Serbia (1,094 m or 3,589 ft)
- Knin Gate (Kninska vrata), Croatia (about 700 m or 2,297 ft)
- Vaganj, Croatia/Bosnia-Herzegovina (1,137 m or 3,730 ft)
- Ivan-Saddle (Ivan-sedlo), Bosnia-Herzegovina (967 m or 3,173 ft)
- Kupres Gate (Kupreška vrata), Bosnia-Herzegovina (1,384 m or 4,541 ft)
- Čemerno, Bosnia-Herzegovina (1,329 m or 4,360 ft)
- Crkvine, Montenegro (1,045 m or 3,428 ft)
- Čakor, Montenegro (1,849 m or 6,066 ft)

== Tunnels ==
Major tunnels transversing the Dinaric Alps include:

- Tuhobić Tunnel, Croatia
- Sveti Rok Tunnel, Croatia
- Mala Kapela Tunnel, Croatia
- Sveti Ilija Tunnel, Croatia

== Rail lines ==
The famous Zagreb–Split via Bihać, Sarajevo–Ploče, and Belgrade–Bar railways traverse the mountains.

== Mountains and plateaus ==
Geomorphological subdivisions of Dinaric Alps Legend: A1: The area of the North Adriatic – the territory of Istria and the Kras area A2: Northern Adriatic – North Adriatic islands A3: Mountains of Dalmatia – Central mountain range A4: Dalmatian Mountains – Coastal Mountain Range A5: The mountains of southern Dalmatia and Mediterranean Herzegovina A6: The islands of Central and South Adriatic and Peljesac A7: Primorje Mountains of Montenegro A8: Coastal and Central Montenegro Mountains – Garač and Katun plateau A9: Mountains of the Montenegrin Rudina A10/11: Mountains of Low Herzegovina B1: Group of Trnovski gozd B2: Snežnik and Risnjak plateaus B3: Plateaus of Inner Carniola and Lower Carniola B4: Velika Kapela B5: Massive Velebit B6: Mala Kapela and central Lika B7: Massif Lička Plješivica B8: Massif Dinara B9: Šator B10: Cincar B11: Klekovača (S) and Grmeč (N) B12: Raduša B13: Čvrsnica B14: Massif Prenj B15: High mountains of Herzegovina – Velež and Herzegovinian Rudine B16: Mountains of High Herzegovina – Mountain range of Crvanj-Lebršnik B17: Zelengora Group B18: Bioč-Maglic-Volujak Group B19: Vranica Group B20: Bjelašnica (Southern Sarajevo Mountains) B21: Mountain range Golija-Vojnik B22: Prekornica B23: Durmitor area B24: Sinjajevina B25: The Morača Mountains and Maganik B26: Ljubišnja B27: Massif Bjelasica B28: Komovi B29: Visitor B30: Kučke planine (Žijovo) B31: Albanian Alps C1: Group of Kočevski Rog C2: Žumberak / Gorjanci Group C3: Central and Eastern Bosnia Mountains – Vlašić Group C4: Central Bosnia Mountains C5: Eastern Bosnia Mountains C6: Central and Eastern Bosnia Mountains – Jahorina Group C7: Mountains of Stari Vlah and Raška (Sandžak) – Kovač-Podrinje Group C8: Mountains of Stari Vlah and Raška (Sandžak) – Zlatar-Pešter Group C9: Mountains of the Stari Vlah – the central group C10: Mountains of Serbia – Podrinje-Valjevo mountains C11: Pre-Dinaric Mountains: Kozara (NW) och Majevica (SE).

The Dinaric Alps are often divided into the Adriatic Platform, the Inner Dinarides and the Outer Dinarides, and sometimes the Supradinaric Nappe. But geologists often differ on which mountains belong to which group.

The mountains and plateaus within the Dinarides are found in the following regions:

=== Albania ===
- Maja Jezercë – (highest peak)
- Maja Grykat e Hapëta
- Maja Radohimës
- Maja e Popljuces
- Maja Briaset
- Maja Hekurave
- Maja Shnikut
- Maja Tat
- Kolata e Mirë
- Maja Rosit
- Maja Kokervhake
- Maja Shkurt
- Maja Malësores
- Maja e Ragamit
- Maja Bojs
- Maja Vukoces
- Shkëlzen
- Maja e Kakisë

=== Bosnia and Herzegovina ===
- Dinara – range's eponym
- Maglić – highest peak in Bosnia & Herzegovina
- Bjelašnica
- Cincar
- Crvanj
- Čabulja
- Čvrsnica
- Grmeč
- Igman
- Jahorina
- Javor
- Kamešnica
- Klekovača
- Konjuh
- Kozara
- Lebršnik
- Lelija
- Orjen
- Osječenica
- Ozren
- Majevica
- Motajica
- Manjača
- Prenj
- Plješivica
- Raduša
- Romanija
- Trebević
- Treskavica
- Šator
- Velež
- Visočica
- Vlasulja
- Vlašić
- Volujak
- Vran
- Vranica
- Zelengora
- Zvijezda

=== Croatia ===
- Dinara – highest peak in Croatia, and second highest of Dinara
- Kamešnica
- Kozjak
- Mosor
- Omiška Dinara
- Biokovo
- Vrgorsko gorje
- Učka
- Ćićarija
- Velebit
- Svilaja
- Velika Kapela
- Mala Kapela
- Žumberak
- Sniježnica

=== Italy ===
- Karst Plateau

=== Kosovo ===
- Gjeravica – highest peak in Kosovo
- Rrasa e Zogut
- Gusani
- Bjeshket e Deçanit
- Majrashi
- Guri i Kuq
- Bjeshket e Rugoves
- Bjeshket e Thata

=== Montenegro ===
- Accursed Mountains – Zla Kolata, highest peak in Montenegro
- Bijela gora
- Durmitor
- Hajla
- Lovćen
- Maganik
- Njegoš
- Orjen
- Rumija
- Sinjajevina

=== Serbia ===
- Mokra Gora – highest peak in Serbia
- Tara
- Zlatibor
- Zlatar
- Golija
- Jadovnik
- Javor
- Ozren
- Bobija
- Pešter
- Medvednik
- Kamena Gora
- Jabuka
- Čemernica
- Javorje
- Ovčar
- Sokolska planina
- Pobijenik
- Murtenica
- Gradina
- Subjel
- Kablar
- Magleš
- Golubac
- Banjsko brdo
- Krstac
- Crni Vrh
- Hum
- Zvijezda
- Suvobor
- Gučevo
- Debela gora
- Povlen
- Maljen

=== Slovenia ===
- Gorjanci
- Kambreško and the Banjšice Plateau
- The Trnovo Forest Plateau (Slovene: Trnovski gozd), Nanos, and Hrušica
- Javornik Hills and Snežnik
- Krim Hills and Menišija
- Bloke
- The Velika Mountain, Stojna and the Gotenica Mountain
- The Mala Mountain, the Kočevski Rog and the Poljane Mountain
- Dry Carniola and Dobrepolje
- Radulja Hills
