= Kollata =

Mountain in Albania

- Mali i Kollatës
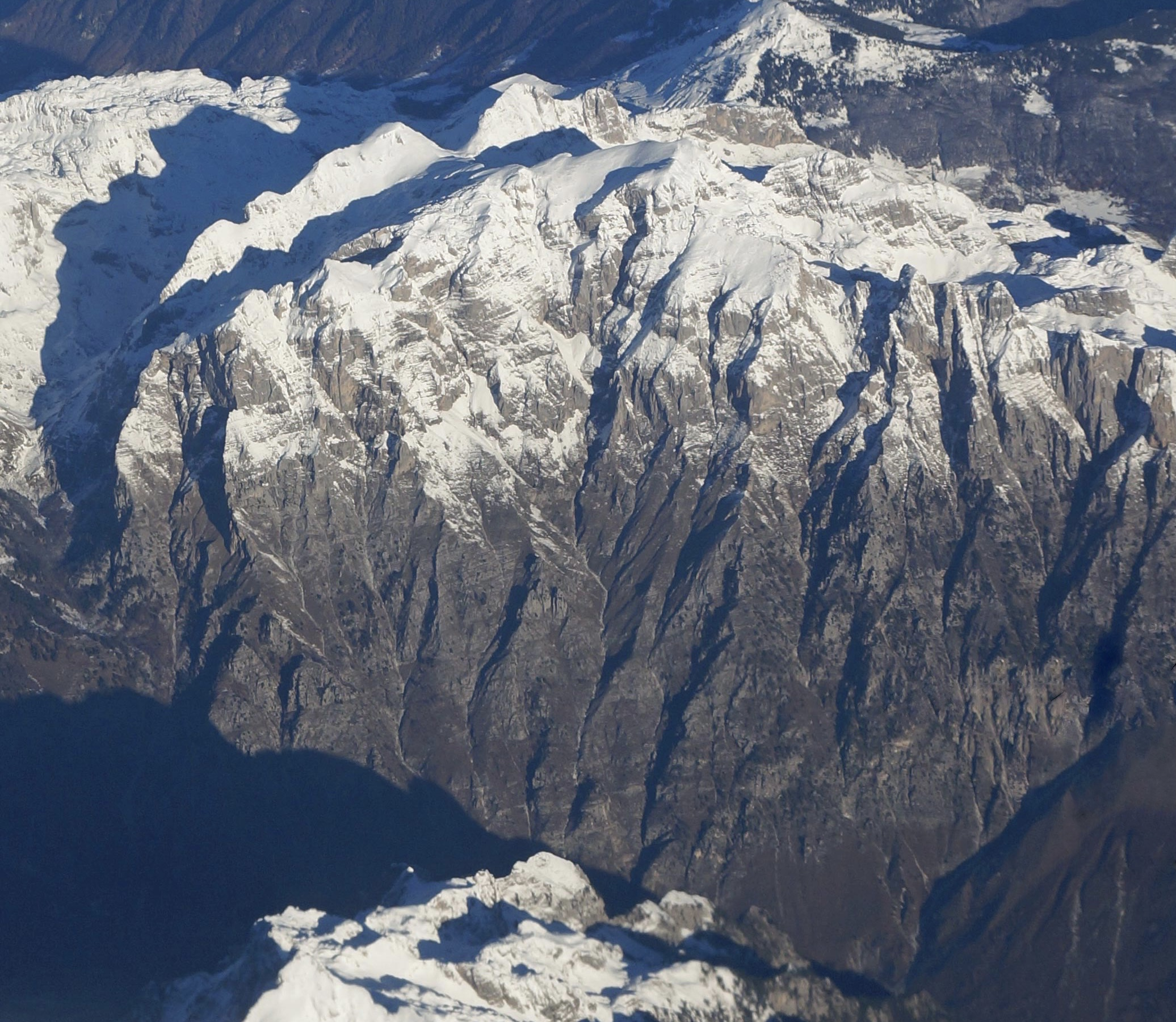
- Aerial view of the Kollata massif

Highest point
- Elevation: 2,553 m (8,376 ft)
- Prominence: 519 m (1,703 ft)
- Isolation: 8.147 km (5.062 mi)
- Coordinates: 42°28′57″N 19°54′31″E

Geography
- Location within Albania Location within Montenegro
- Countries: Albania; Montenegro
- Region: Albanian Alps
- Municipality: Tropojë
- Parent range: Blloku Kollatë

Geology
- Rock age: Neogene
- Mountain type: massif
- Rock type: carbonate

Kollata is a massif in the Albanian Alps, located between Kukaj stream and Valbonë pass in the west, the upper Valbonë Valley in the south, Cerem basin in the east and extending beyond the state border with Montenegro to the north. Its highest peak, Maja e Kollatës, reaches a height of 2,553 m (8,376 ft). On the Montenegrin side rise two smaller peaks that overlap into the Albanian territory, Zla Kolata 2,535 m (8,317 ft) and Dobra Kolata 2,525 m (8,284 ft), which are the highest and second highest mountains in Montenegro, respectively.

== Geology ==
The massif is composed entirely of a carbonate structure, with its surrounding slopes representing the plains of tectonic faults, cutting into the nearby valleys. The highest peak, Maja e Kollatës, stands at 2,553 meters tall and features a triangular shape, with a nearly flat surface called Podi i Kollatës, made up of flaky formations that are remnants of the Neogene era. After breaking at the tectonic-erosion pass of Rrethi i Bardhë, it continues to Maja e Thatë 2,406 m (7,894 ft) where it makes a sharp sudden turn from the northwest, breaking again at Qafa e Rupes 2,130 m (6,990 ft), finally culminating at the border peak of Maja e Rosit 2,524 m (8,281 ft).

The western slope, wedged between Maja e Thatë and Maja e Rosit, has been shaped by intense frost activity, resulting in a relatively gentle relief called Pllana e Kukajt, which gradually descends into the glacial valley of Kukaj. The eastern slope is more fragmented, mainly due to its positioning at the forefront of the overpass. Here, where the cirques of the northeastern and eastern slopes end, two glacial-karst pits form, Mijusha and Lugu i Madh, both hanging over the Cerem basin.

The peak section of the massif between Kollata and Maja e Rosit is divided by three troughs which have been shaped by glacial activity and formed along normal tectonic faults. The troughs of Perslopi and Vijat e Ujit flaunt in an almost parallel orientation between them (northeast-southwest), while the trough of Qafa e Rupes runs transversely.

== Biodiversity ==
The rugged terrain offers limited vegetation cover. A narrow beech belt grows at heights of 1,400–1,500 m (4,600–4,900 ft). As the altitude increases, the landscape transitions to alpine pastures, filling the higher reaches of the massif.

== See also ==
- List of mountains in Albania
- List of mountains in Montenegro
