= List of mountains in Montenegro =

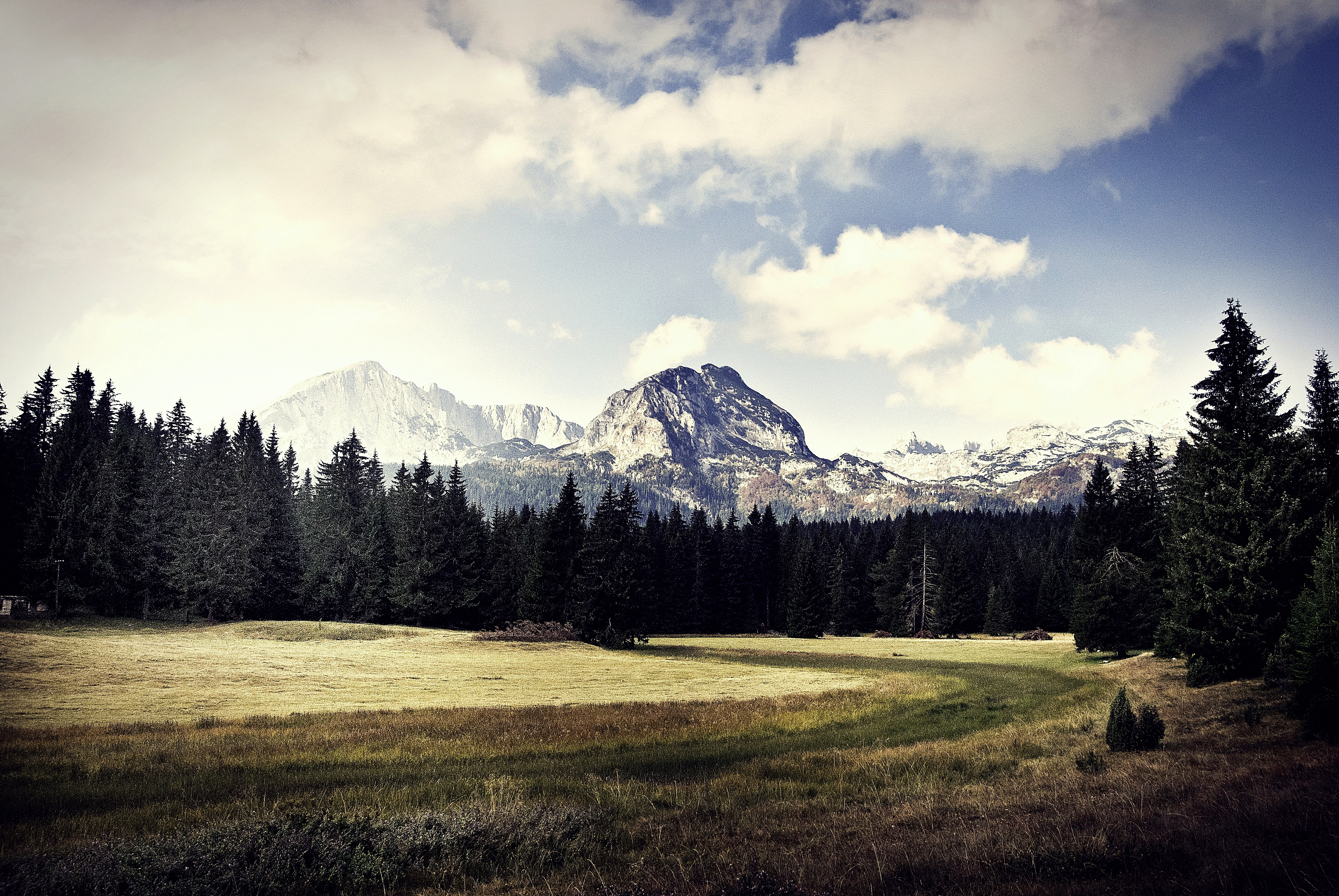
Durmitor

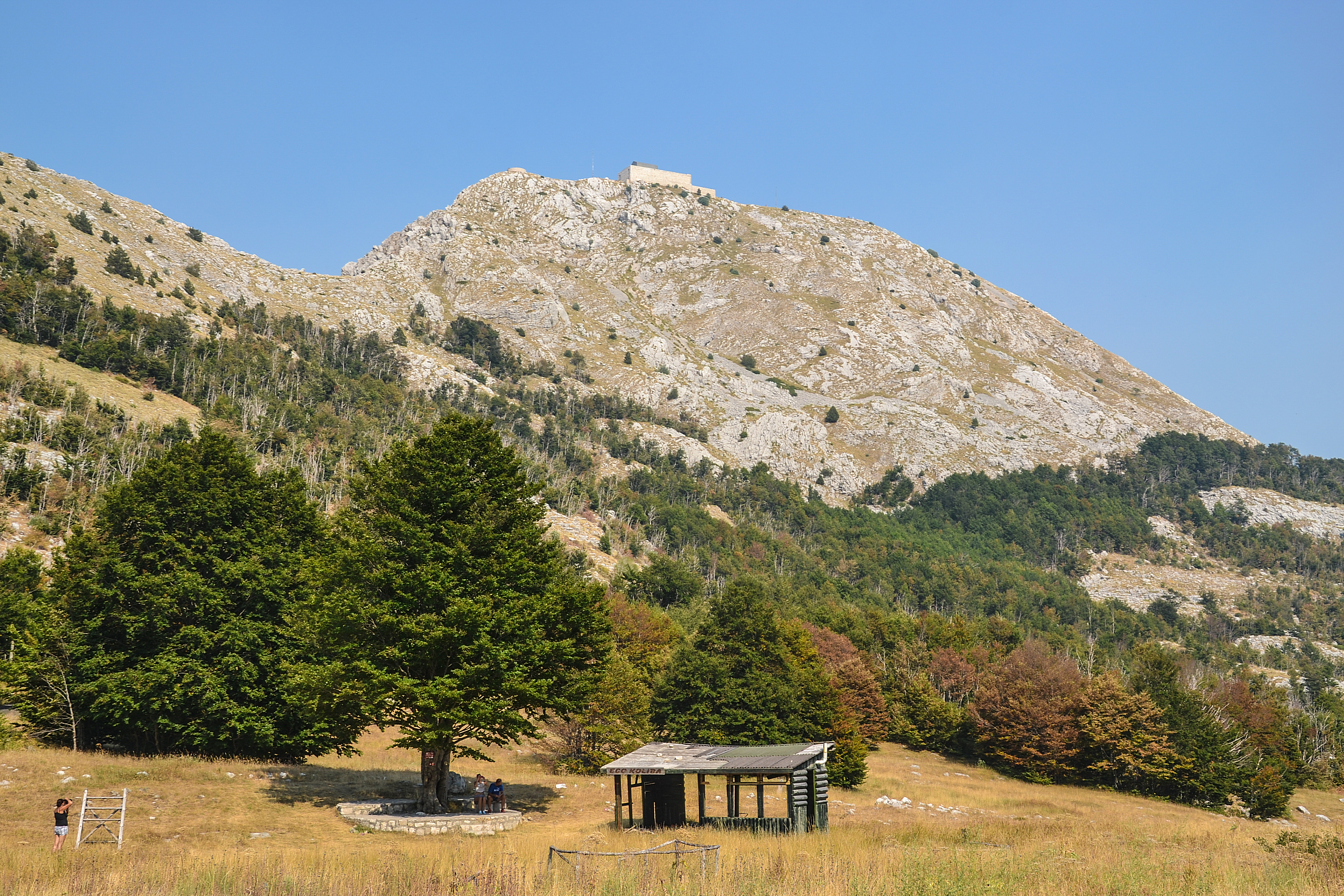
Lovćen

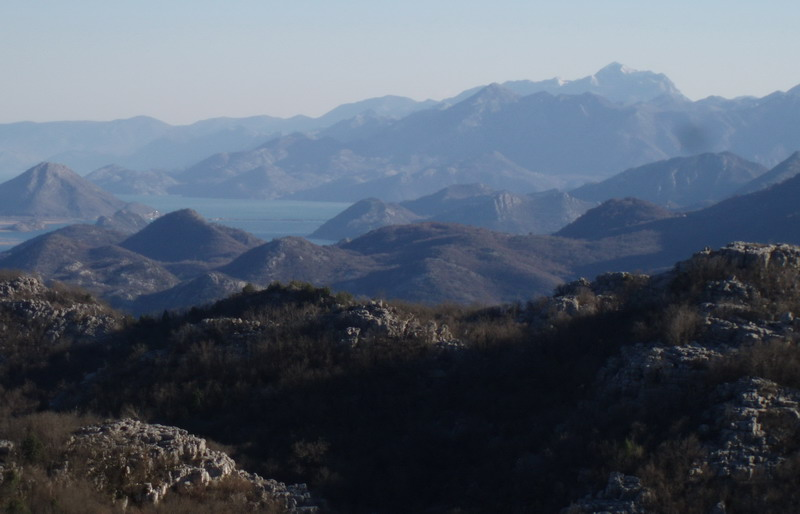
Rumija

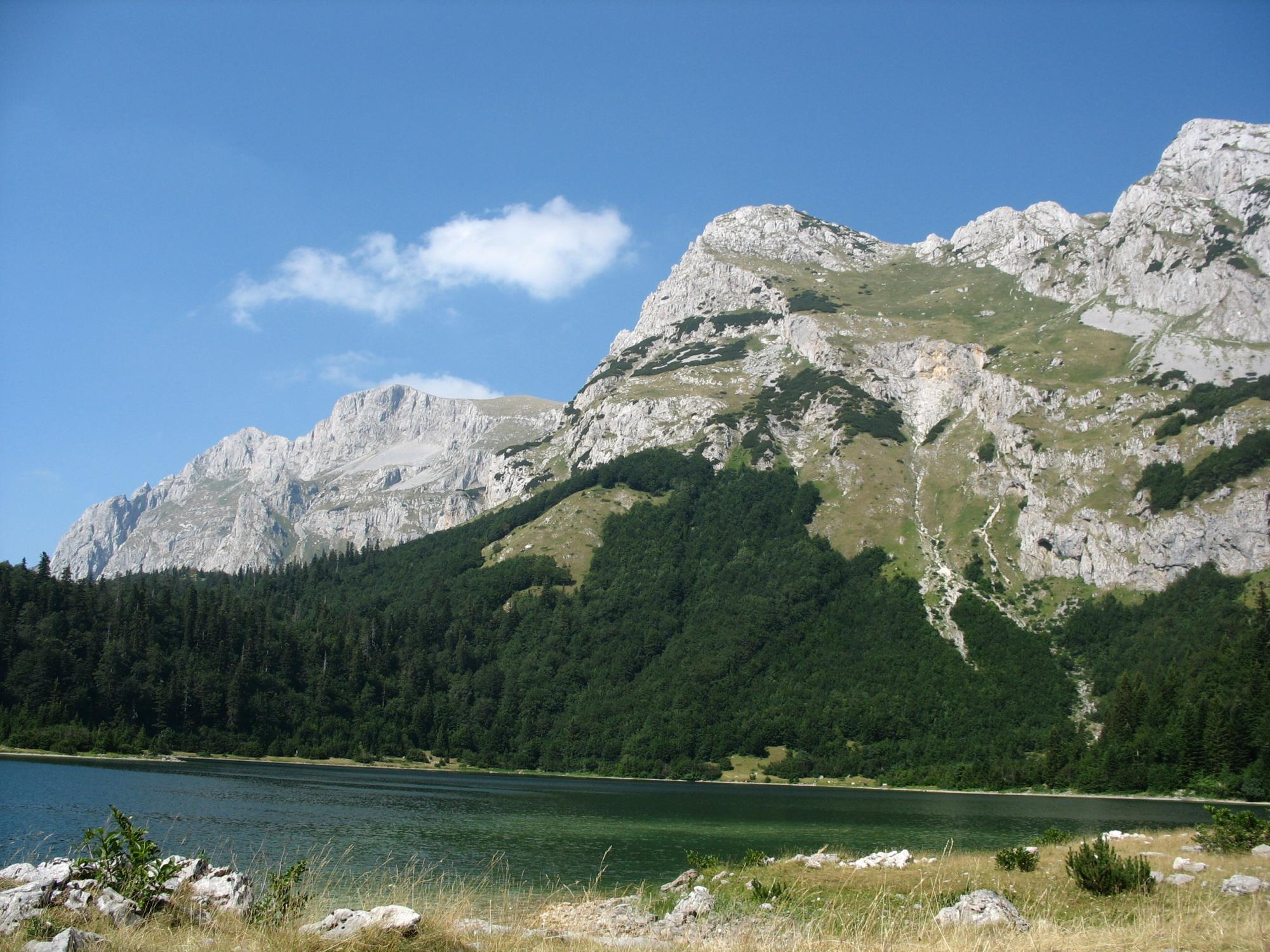
Maglić

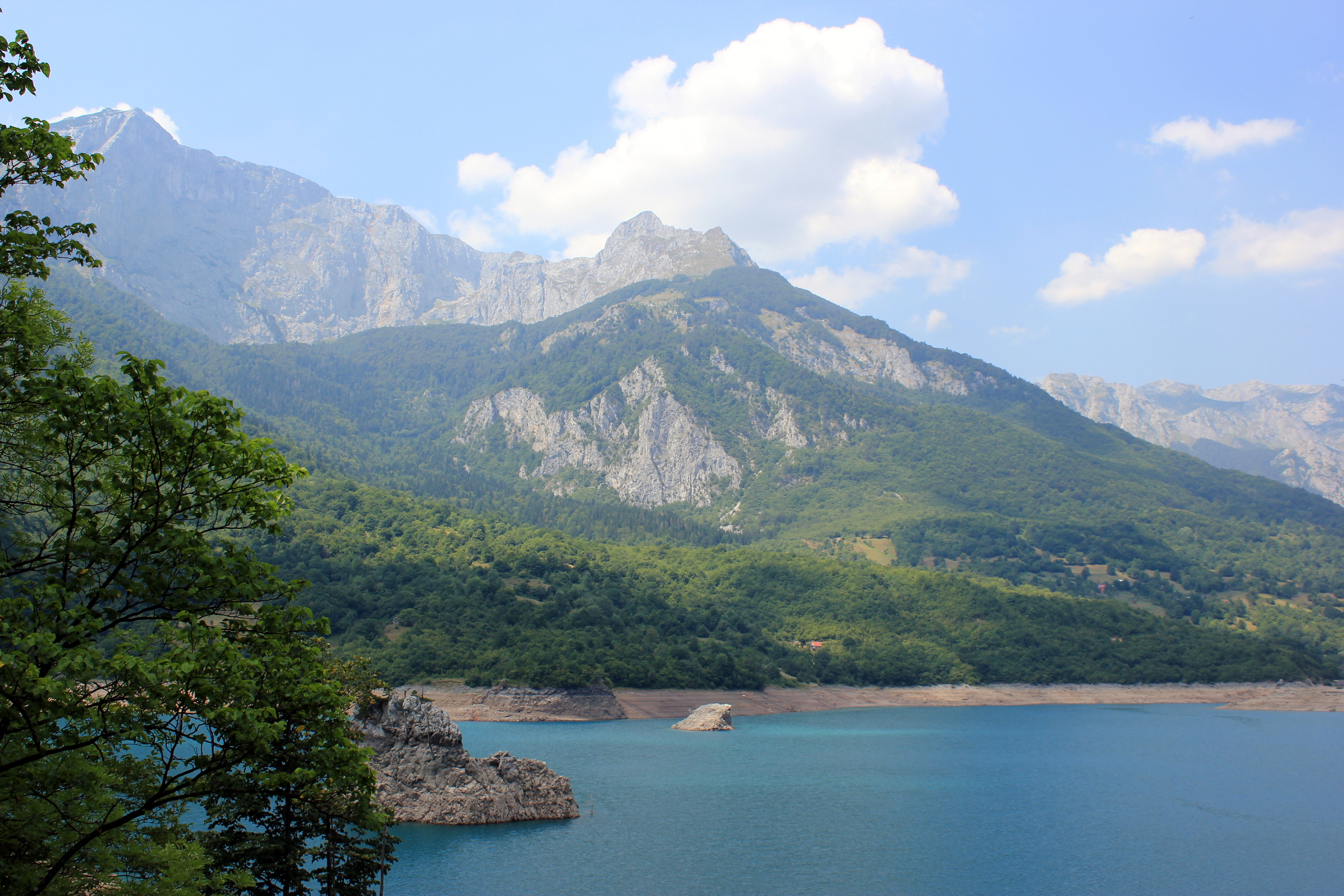
Pivska Planina

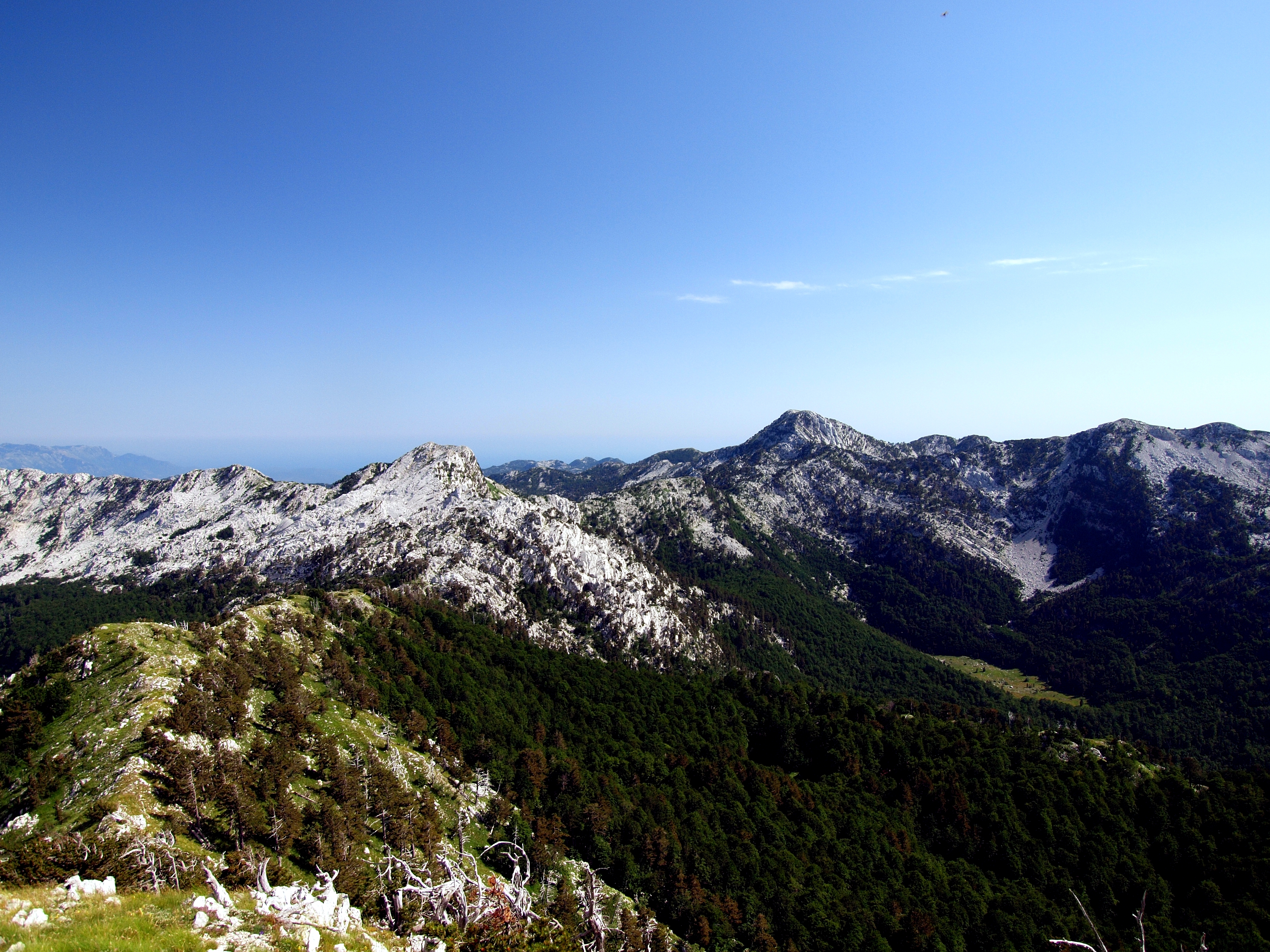
Orjen

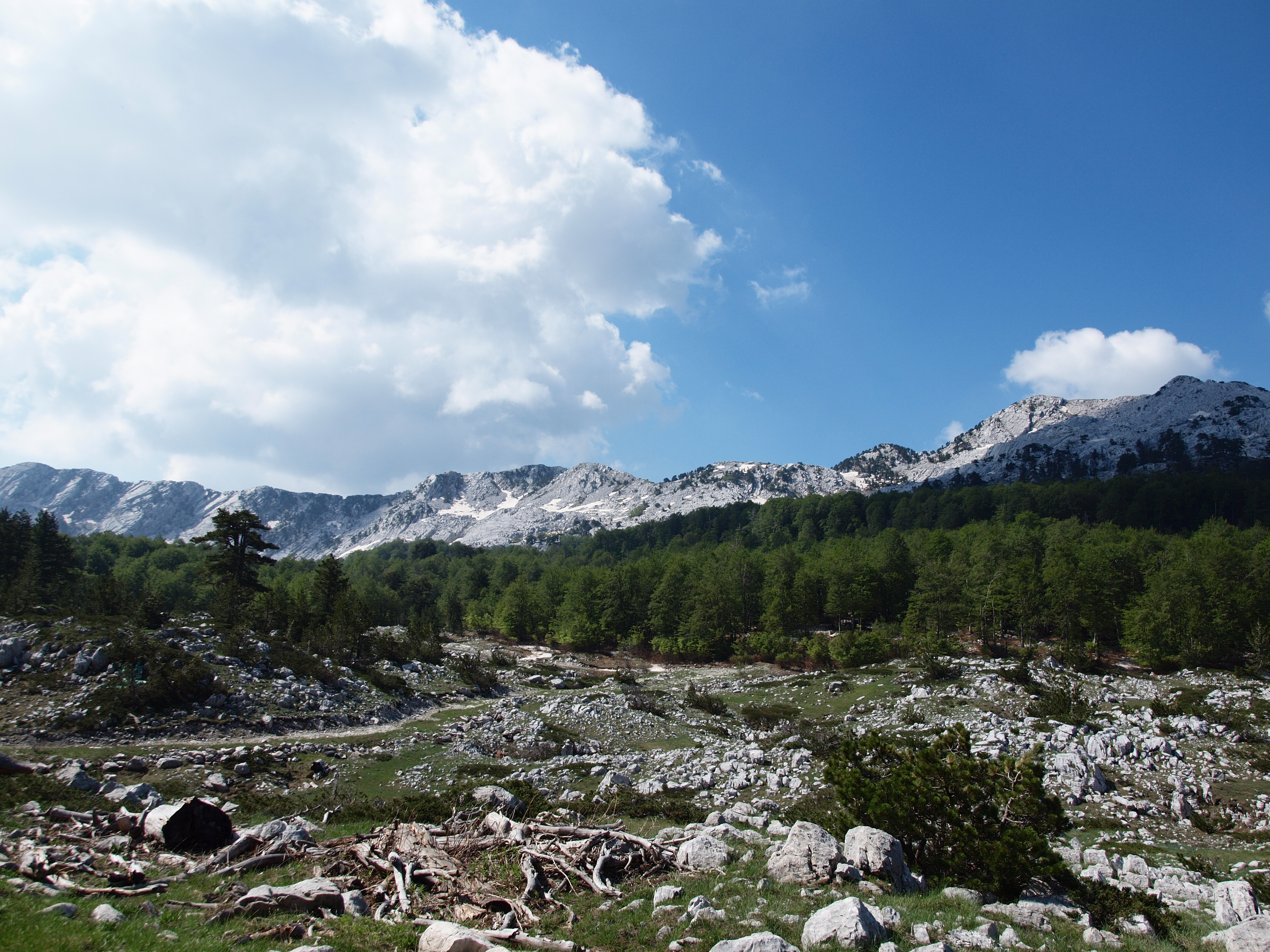
Bijela Gora

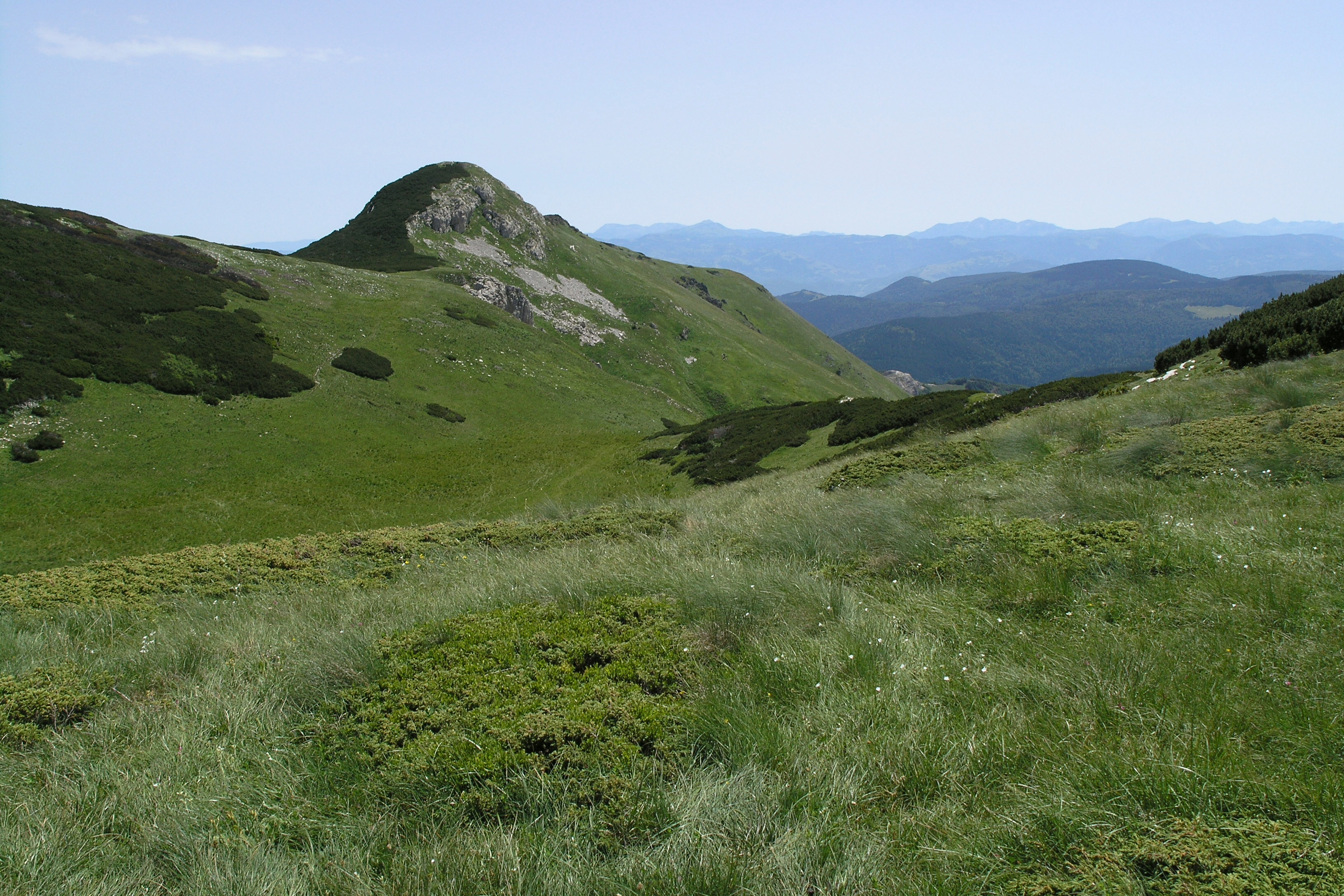
Bjelasica

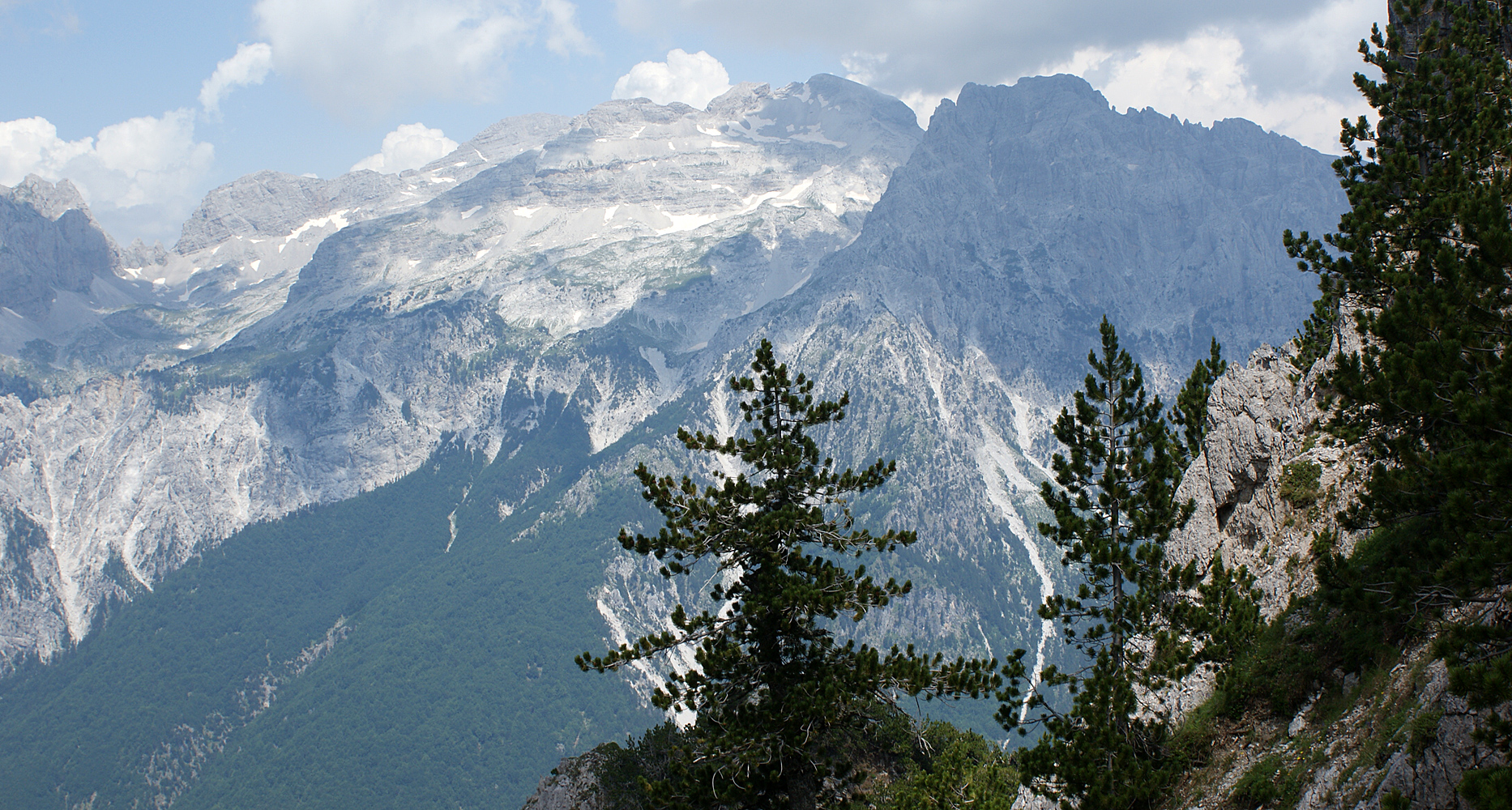
Accursed Mountains

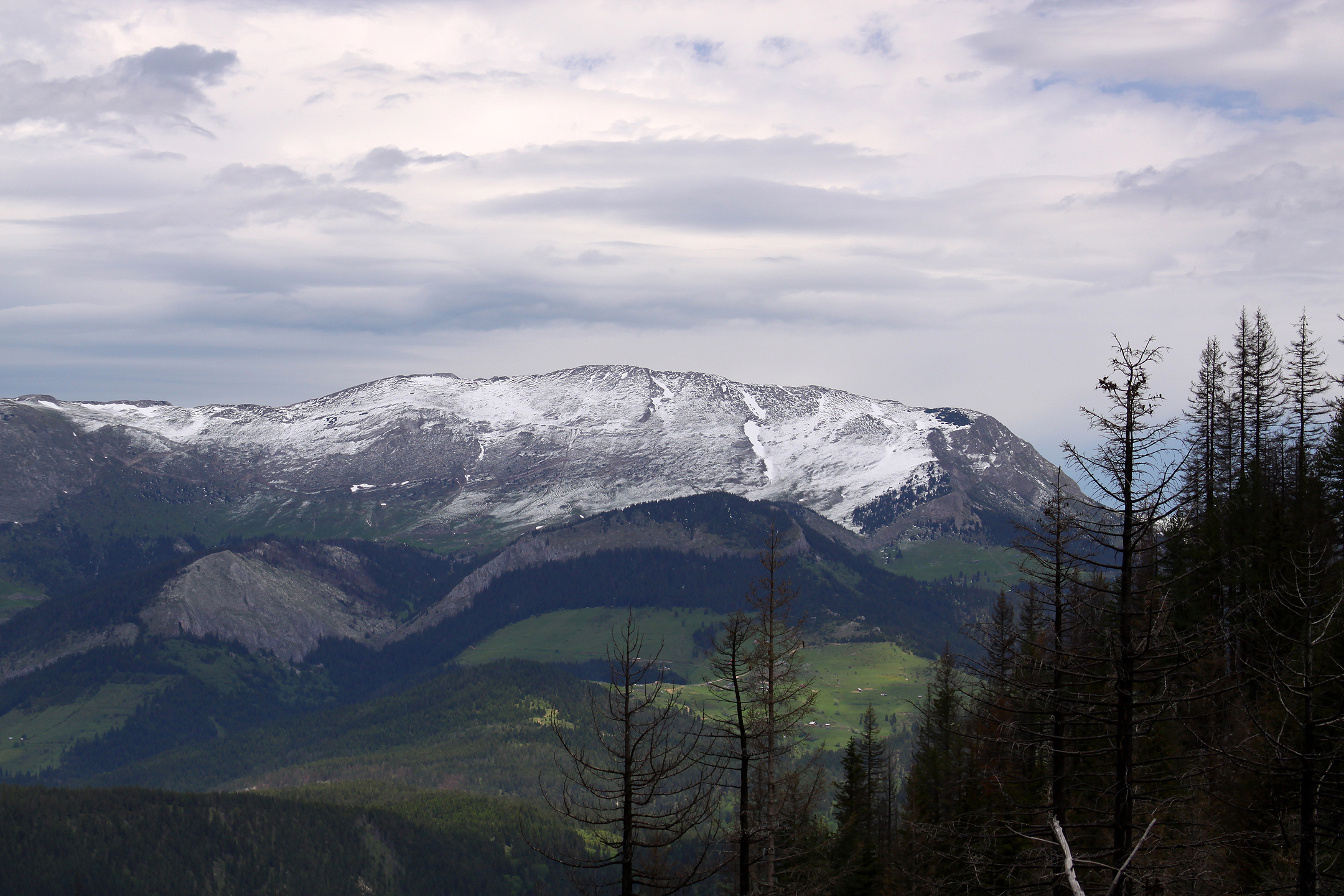
Hajla

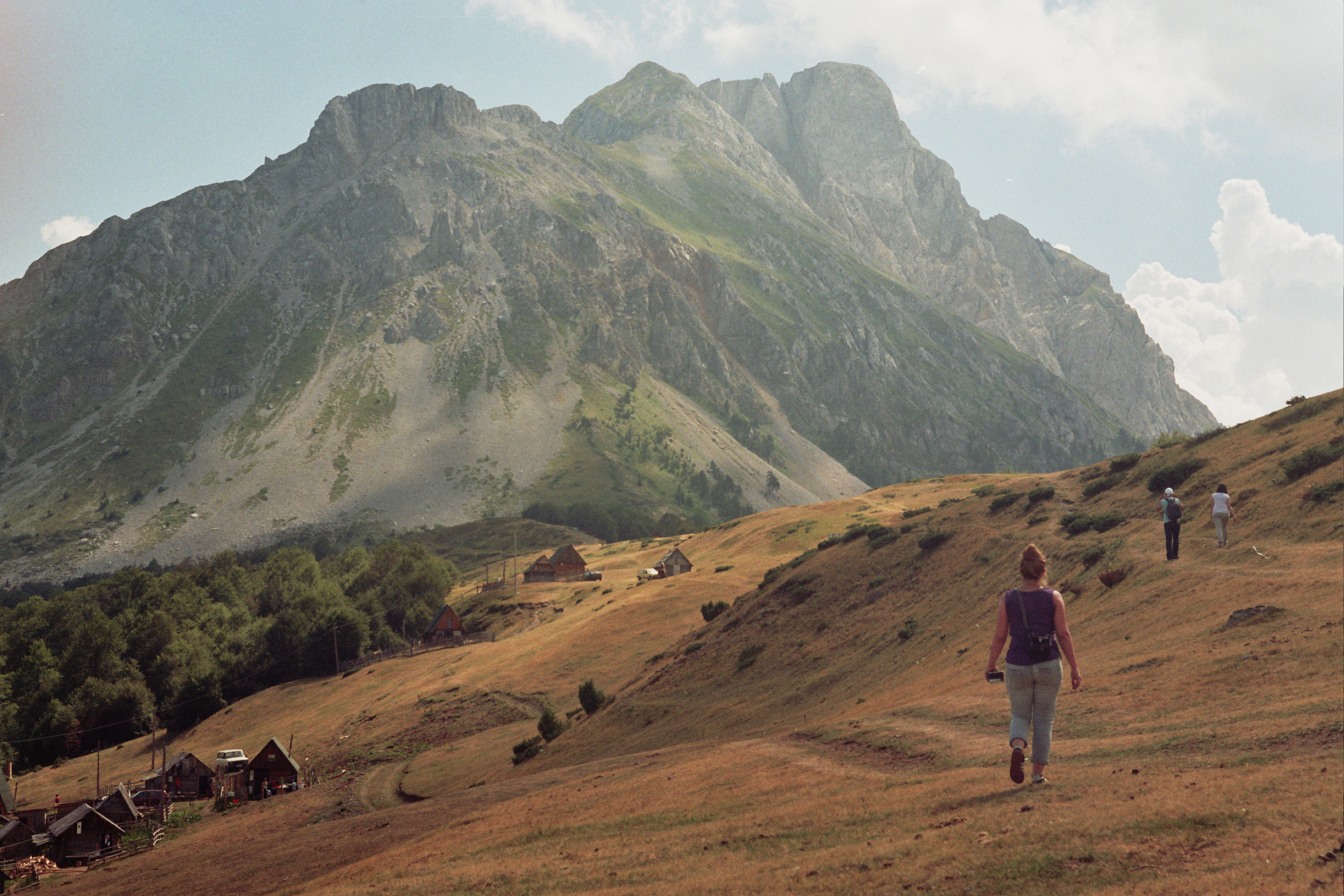
Komovi

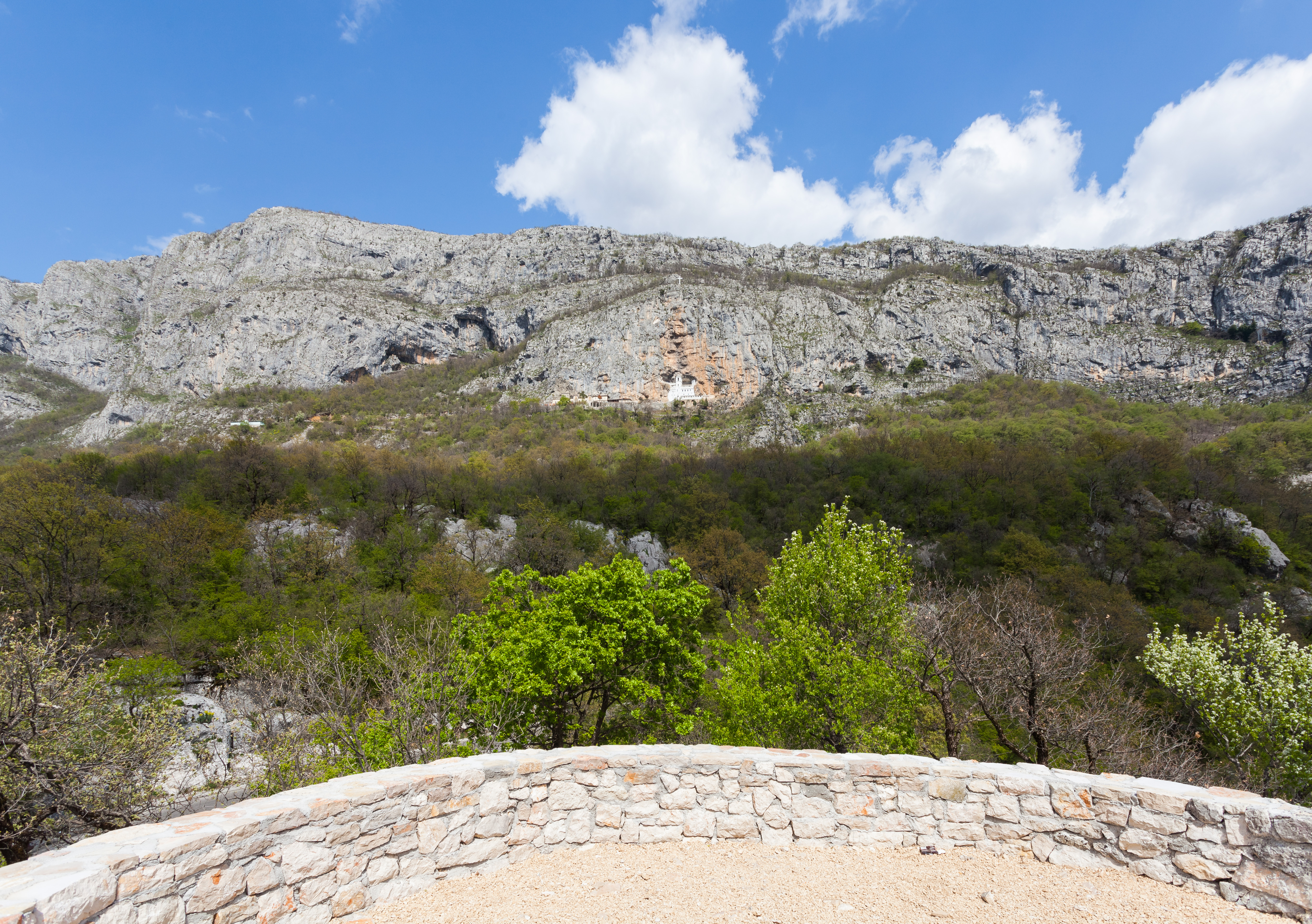
Ostroška greda

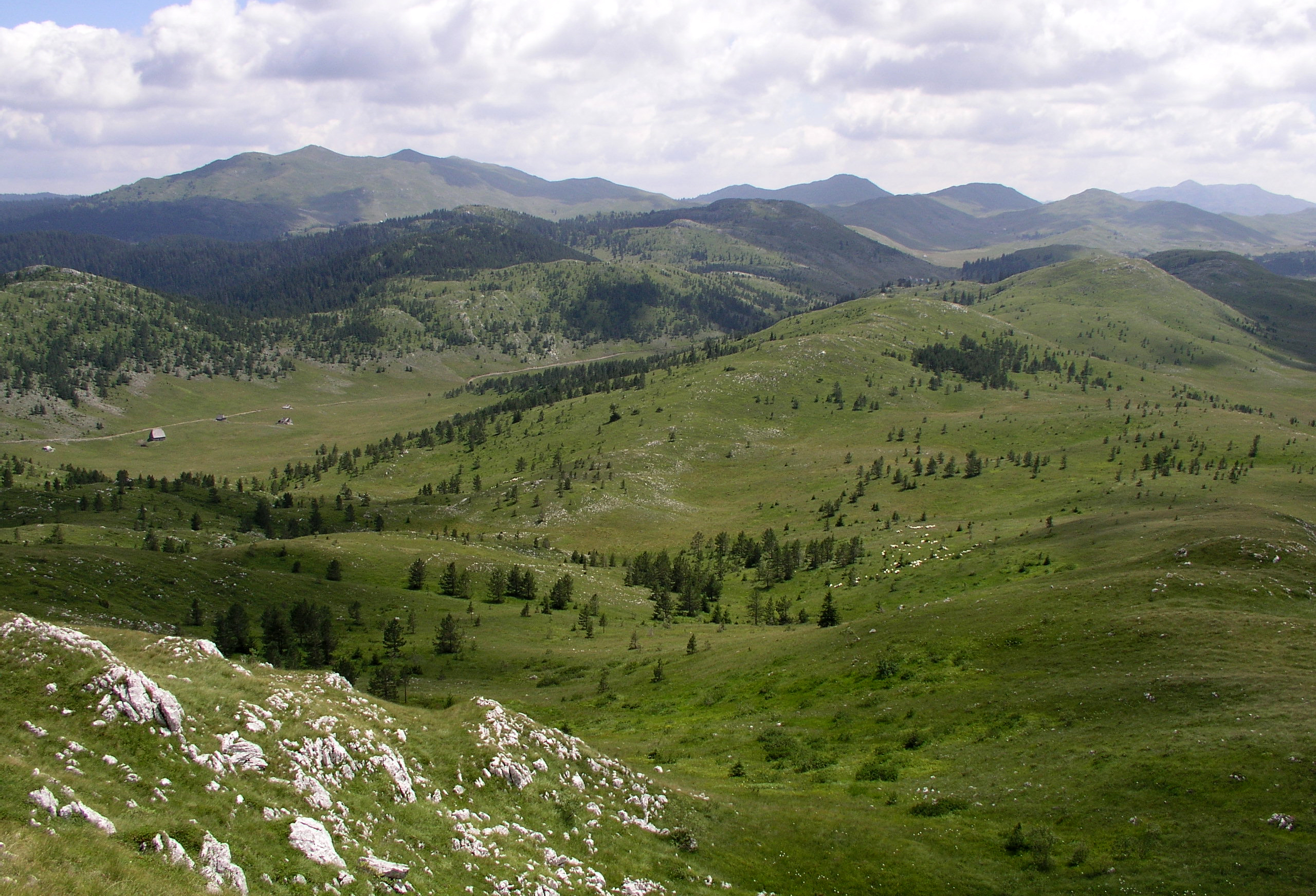
Sinjajevina

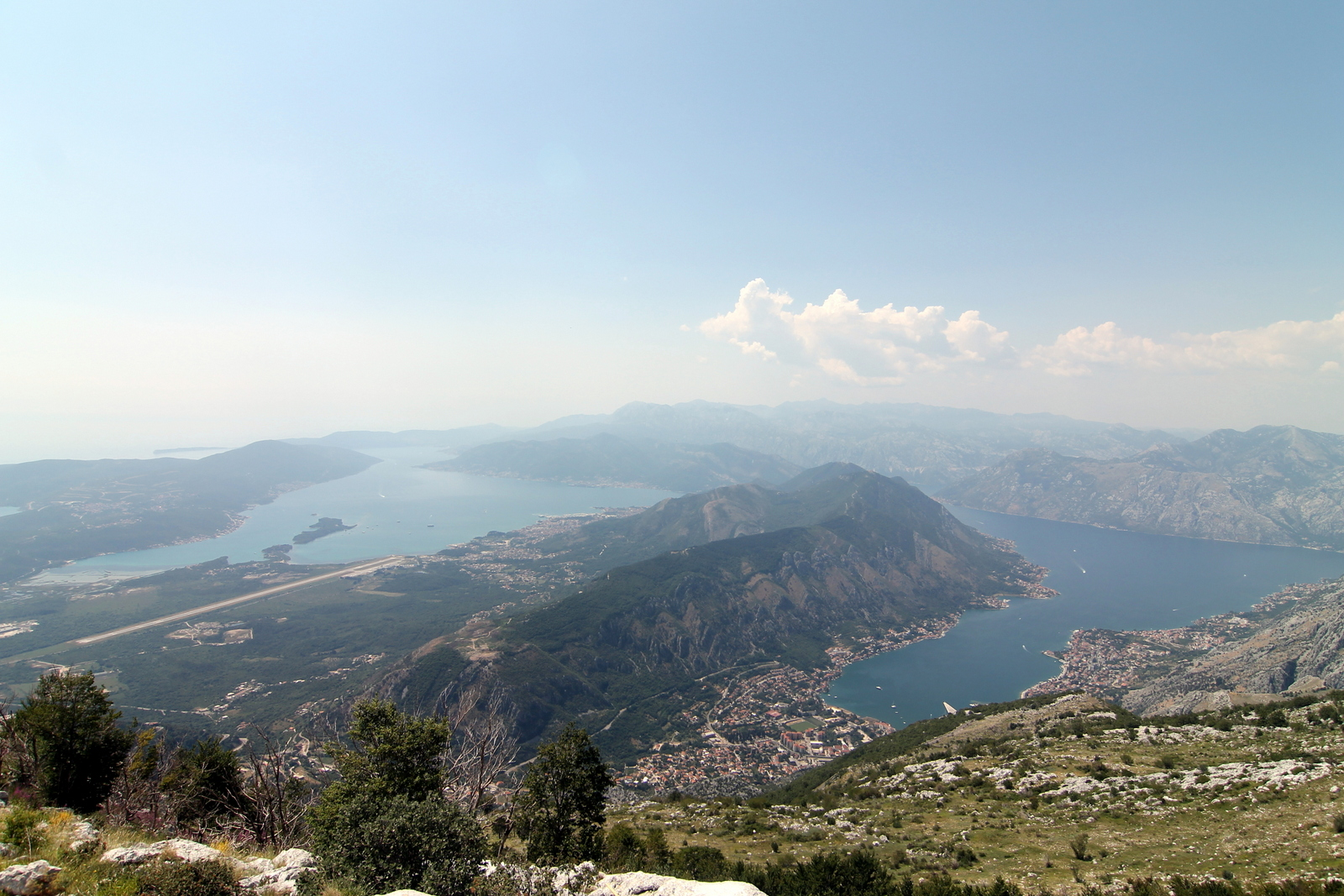
Vrmac

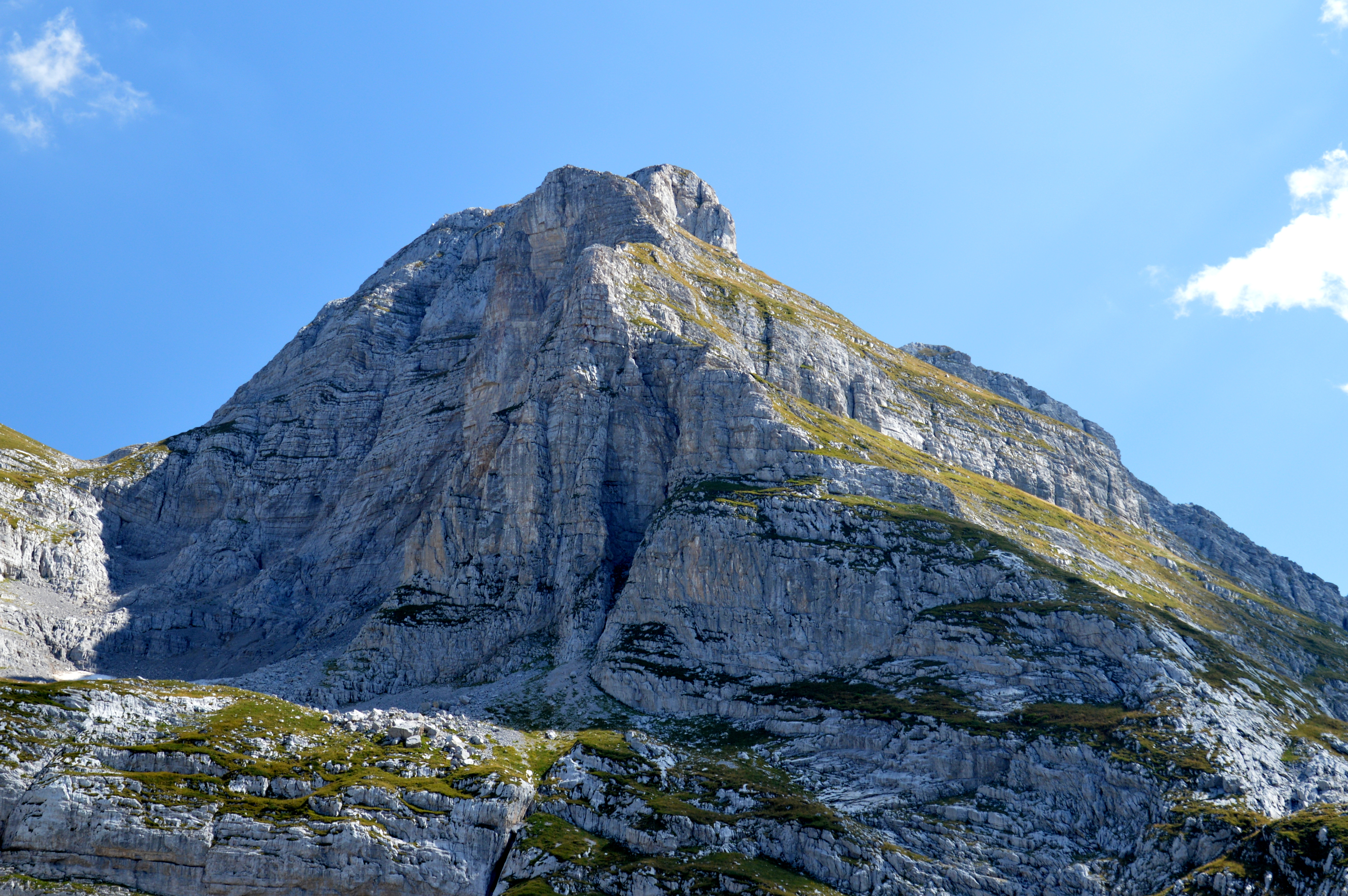
Zla Kolata

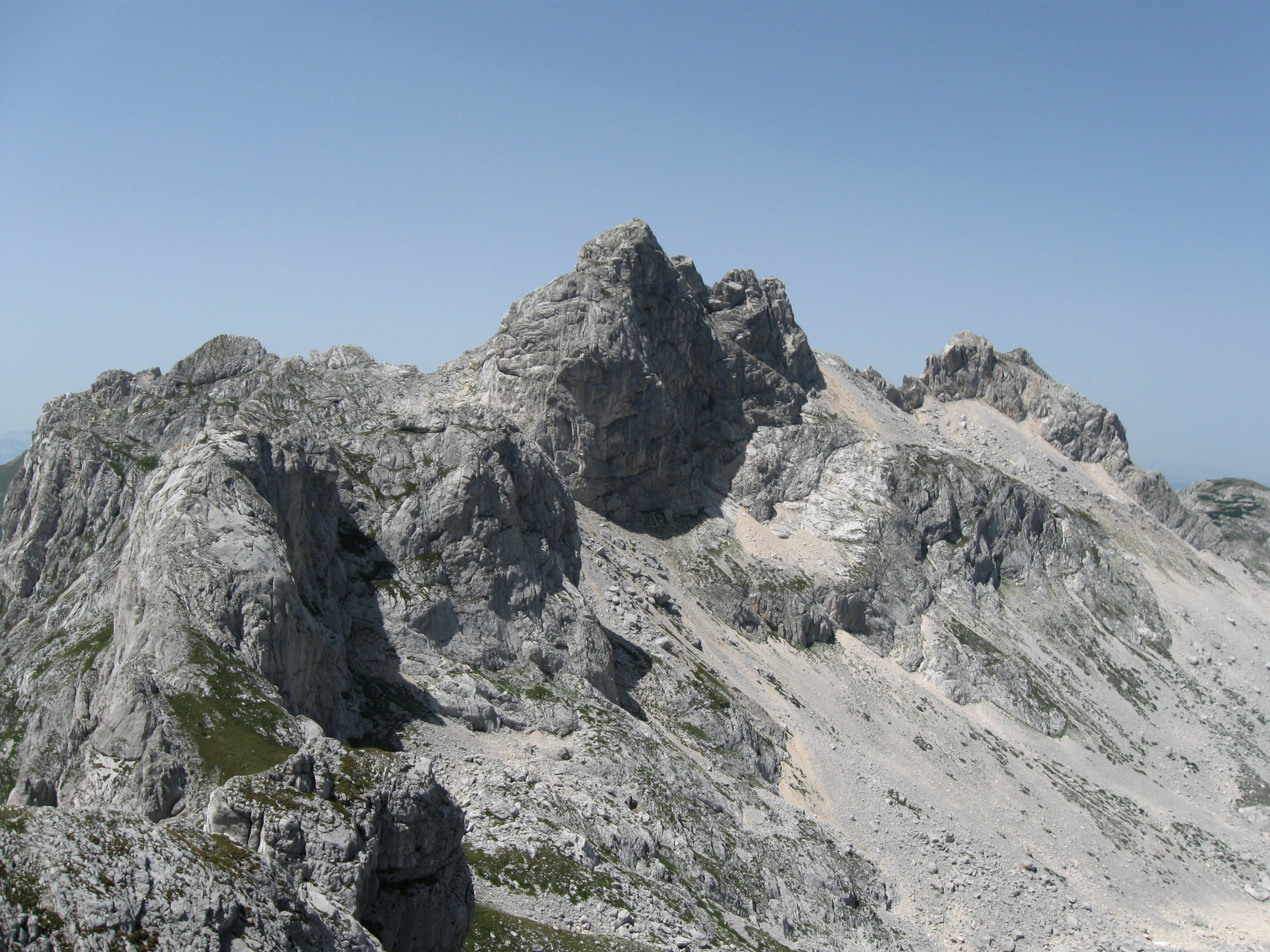
Bobotov Kuk

This is a list of mountains in Montenegro.

== List of mountains ==
- Bijela gora
- Bioč
- Bjelasica
- Bolj
- Bogićevica
- Crna planina
- Durmitor
- Golija
- Gradina
- Hajla
- Ključ
- Komovi
- Kovač
- Lastva
- Lisa
- Lisac
- Lovćen
- Lola
- Lukavica
- Lebršnik
- Ljubišnja
- Maganik
- Maglić
- Mokra Gora
- Mokra planina
- Možura
- Njegoš
- Ostroška Greda
- Obzir
- Orjen
- Prekornica
- Pivska planina
- Accursed Mountains
- Rumija
- Sinjavina
- Somina
- Stožac
- Visitor
- Vojnik
- Volujak
- Vučje
- Vrmac
- Zagradac
- Zeletin
- Žijevo
- Žljeb
- Žurim

== Mountain peaks over 2,000 m ==
| Mountain | Peak | Altitude, m |
|---|---|---|
| Accursed Mountains | Zla Kolata | 2,535 |
| Accursed Mountains | Dobra Kolata | 2,528 |
| Accursed Mountains | Rosni vrh | 2,524 |
| Durmitor | Bobotov Kuk | 2,523 |
| Accursed Mountains | Maja e Qafe Cezles | 2,496 |
| Accursed Mountains | Veliki vrh | 2,490 |
| Komovi | Kom Kučki | 2,487 |
| Durmitor | Bezimeni vrh | 2,487 |
| Komovi | Kom Ljevorečki | 2,469 |
| Komovi | Kom Vasojevićki | 2,461 |
| Durmitor | Šljeme | 2,445 |
| Hajla | Hajla | 2,403 |
| Bioč | Bioč | 2,396 |
| Maglić | Maglić | 2,386 |
| Trekufiri | Accursed Mountains | 2,366 |
| Bogićevica | Bogićevica | 2,358 |
| Volujak | Studenac | 2,254 |
| Durmitor | Suva Rltina | 2,284 |
| Hajla | Štedim | 2,272 |
| Sinjajevina | Babin Zub | 2,253 |
| Ljubišnja | Dernečište | 2,238 |
| Lola | Kapa Moračka | 2,227 |
| Gradište | Gradište | 2,214 |
| Visitor | Visitor | 2,210 |
| Sinjajevina | Jablanov vrh | 2,223 |
| Visitor | Visitor | 2,196 |
| Žijovo | Štitan | 2,182 |
| Lola | Zebalac | 2,157 |
| Accursed Mountains | Mali Sapit | 2,148 |
| Crna Planina | Maglić | 2,141 |
| Maganik | Međeđi vrh | 2,139 |
| Bjelasica | Crna Glava | 2,137 |
| Žijovo | Žijovo | 2,130 |
| Zeletin | Zeletin | 2,125 |
| Maganik | Petrov Vrh | 2,123 |
| Bjelasica | Strmenica | 2,122 |
| Hajla | Maja Dramadol | 2,119 |
| Bjelasica | Zekova Glava | 2,116 |
| Žijovo | Vila | 2,093 |
| Pivska planina | Veliki Bruškovac | 2,093 |
| Bjelasica | Kosara | 2,079 |
| Bjelasica | Troglava | 2,072 |
| Bjelasica | Pešića Glava | 2,056 |
| Bjelasica | Strmni Pad | 2,050 |
| Sinjajevina | Pećarac | 2,041 |
| Bjelasica | Razvršje | 2,033 |
| Lukavica | Veliki Žurim | 2,030 |
| Žijovo | Suvi vrh | 2,029 |
| Sinjajevina | Babin vrh | 2,010 |
| Bjelasica | Potrkovo | 2,009 |
| Bjelasica | Crna Lokva | 2,008 |

== See also ==
- Geography of Montenegro
- List of lakes of Montenegro
- List of rivers of Montenegro
- List of mountains in Serbia
