= Kovač planina =

- Ковач планина
- Location within Montenegro

Highest point
- Elevation: 1,532 m (5,026 ft)
- Coordinates: 43°31′00″N 19°07′20″E

Geography
- Location: Pljevlja, Montenegro
- Parent range: Dinaric Alps

Kovač planina (Cyrillic: Ковач планина) is a mountain in the municipality of Pljevlja, Montenegro. It has an altitude of 1,532 metres (5,026 ft).

== See also ==
- List of mountains in Montenegro
