= Vignaux =

- Commune
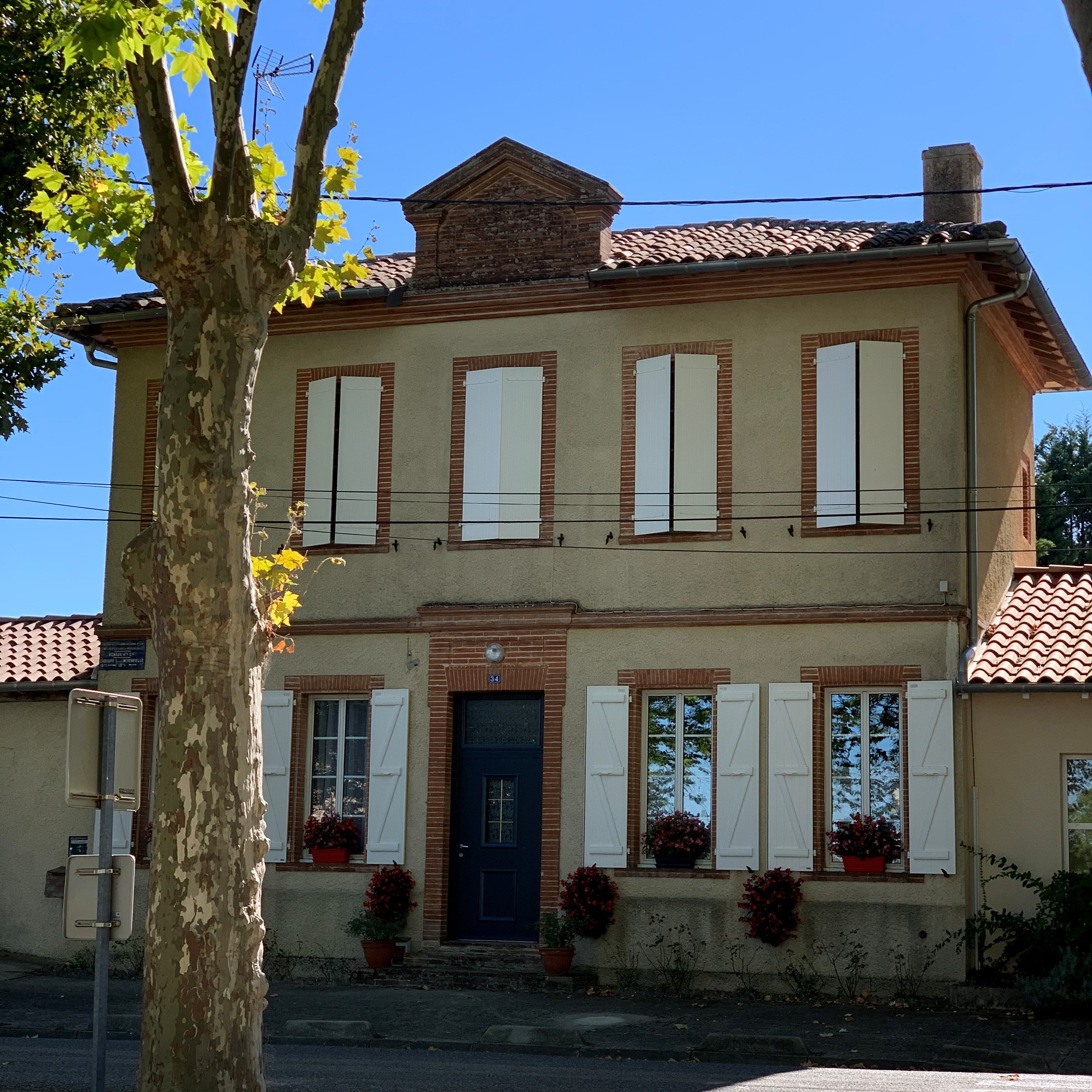
- Town hall

- Coat of arms
- Location of Vignaux
- Location within France Location within Occitanie
- Coordinates: 43°41′11″N 1°04′06″E
- Country: France
- Region: Occitania
- Department: Haute-Garonne
- Arrondissement: Toulouse
- Canton: Léguevin
- Intercommunality: Hauts Tolosans

Government
  - Mayor (2020–2026): Roland Leconte
- Area^{1}: 4.04 km^{2} (1.56 sq mi)
- Elevation: 107 m (351 ft)
- Highest elevation: 244 m (801 ft)
- Lowest elevation: 156 m (512 ft)
- Population (2023): 157
  - Density: 38.9/km^{2} (101/sq mi)
- Time zone: UTC+01:00 (CET)
  - Summer (DST): UTC+02:00 (CEST)
- INSEE/Postal code: 31577 /31480
- ^{1} French Land Register data, which excludes lakes, ponds, glaciers > 1 km^{2} (0.386 sq mi or 247 acres) and river estuaries.

Vignaux is a commune in the Haute-Garonne department in southwestern France.

== Geography ==
Vignaux is located on the border with the Gers department, about 33 km (21 mi) northwest of Toulouse. The commune is bordered by Caubiac to the north, Garac to the east, Bellegarde-Sainte-Marie to the southeast and south, and Encausse to the west.

== Population ==
Historical population
Year	Pop.	±% p.a.
1968	101	—
1975	98	−0.43%
1982	110	+1.66%
1990	101	−1.06%
1999	100	−0.11%
2007	117	+1.98%
2012	120	+0.51%
2017	135	+2.38%
2023	157	+2.55%
Source: INSEE

== See also ==
- Communes of the Haute-Garonne department
