= List of mountains in Serbia and Montenegro =

List of mountains of Serbia and Montenegro may refer to:

- List of mountains in Montenegro
- List of mountains in Serbia
- List of mountains in Kosovo
