= Garac =

Garac may refer to:

- Garač, a mountain in central Montenegro
- Garac, France
