= Vlasulja =

Mountain in Bosnia and Herzegovina

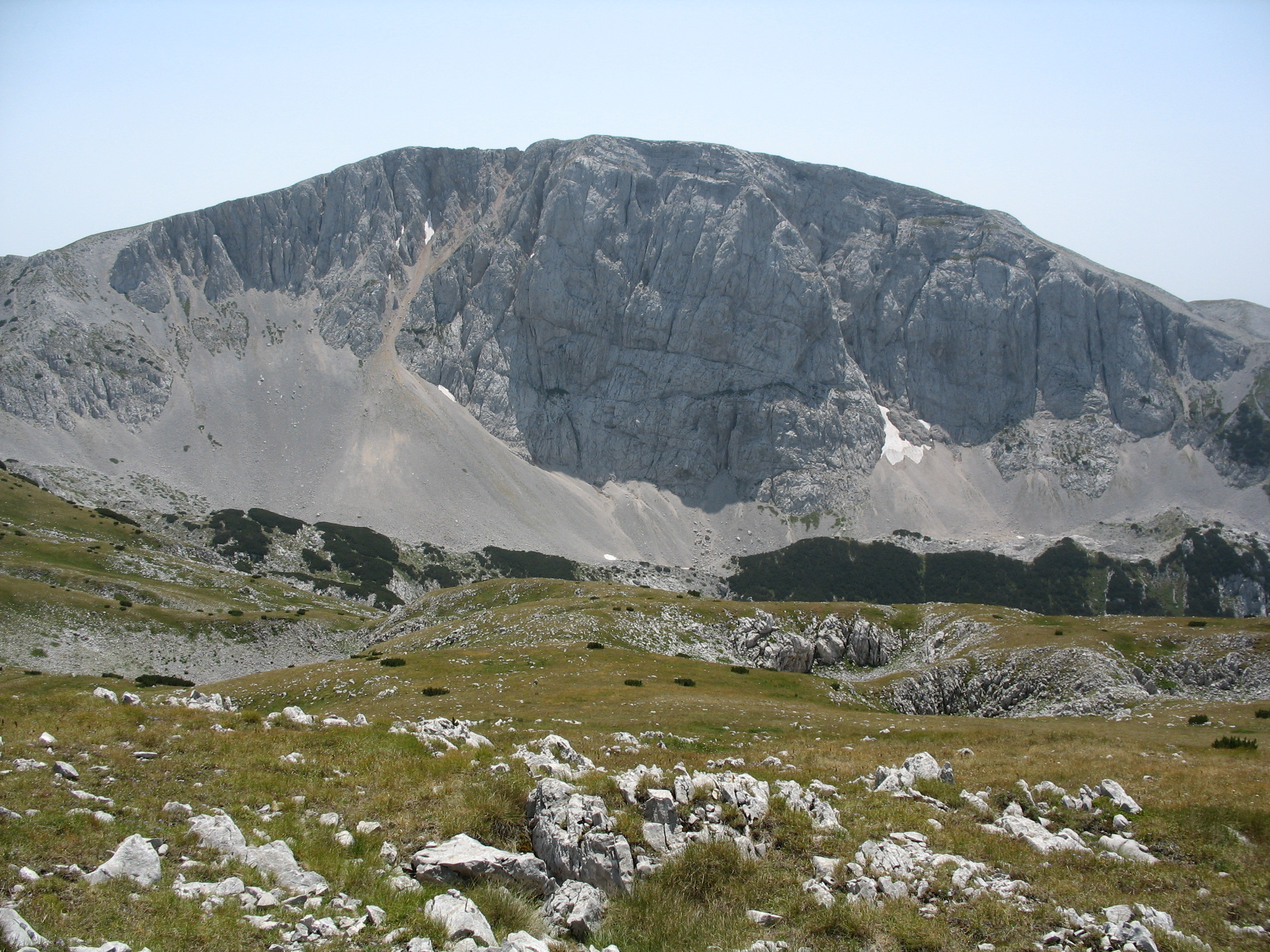
- Mountain Vlasulja (2336 m) in Volujak Mts. from Trnovački Durmitor (2235 m).

Highest point
- Elevation: 2,314 m (7,592 ft)
- Coordinates: 43.2328°N 18.7153°E

Geography
- Location within Bosnia and Herzegovina
- Location: Bosnia and Herzegovina
- Parent range: Dinaric Alps

Vlasulja is a mountain in the municipality of Foča, Bosnia and Herzegovina. It has an altitude of 2,314 metres (7,592 ft).

== See also ==
- List of mountains in Bosnia and Herzegovina
