= Vojnik (mountain) =

Mountain in Montenegro

- Војник
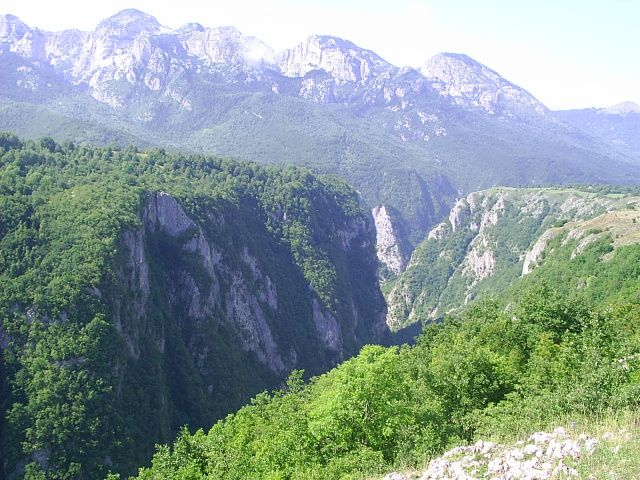
- Komarnica canyon with Vojnik in the background

Highest point
- Elevation: 1,998 m (6,555 ft)
- Coordinates: 42°56′10″N 19°00′35″E

Geography
- Location within Montenegro
- Location: Montenegro

Vojnik (pronounced [vojniːk], Montenegrin Cyrillic: Војник) is a mountain range located between the city of Nikšić and towns Šavnik and Plužine in western Montenegro. The name of the mountains means "soldier" in Montenegrin language. The highest point of Vojnik is the eponymous peak which is 1,998 m (6,555 ft) high.

== Features ==
Vojnik mountain range is approximately 17 kilometres long and its maximum width is 8 kilometres. It covers a total area of 138 square kilometres, or approximately 1% of the entire territory of Montenegro, and has 48 peaks higher than 1,500 meters. Vojnik is separated from the surrounding Montenegrin mountains (Maglić, Volujak, Bioč, Durmitor and Morača mountains) by highlands or deep river canyons.

Vojnik mountain with its wider mountain area spreads north of Nikšić polje, west of the Krnovo plateau and the eponymous mountain pass, east of Javorak forested mountain area with Javorak mountain pass, and south of Komarnica and Bukovica river canyons. The central part of the mountain is 20 kilometres north of the city of Nikšić and dominates the city's northern horizon.

The geological composition of Vojnik is similar to that of neighbouring mountains, Maganik, Golija and Prekornica. It is predominantly made of limestone, and rich in karstic formations.

=== Peaks ===
Vojnik mountain range encompasses a total of 48 peaks higher than 1,500 meters. Five highest peaks of Vojnik are:

- Vojnik 1,998 m (6,555 ft)
- Bezimeni vrh 1,967 m (6,453 ft)
- Gradni vrh 1,961 m (6,434 ft)
- Bezimeni vrh 1,947 m (6,388 ft)
- Mramorje 1,920 m (6,299 ft)
