= Golija (Montenegro) =

Mountain in western Montenegro

- Голија
- Location within Montenegro

Highest point
- Elevation: 1,942 m (6,371 ft)
- Coordinates: 42°59′27″N 18°48′37″E

Geography
- Location: Montenegro
- Parent range: Dinaric Alps

Golija is a mountain in the Dinaric Alps range in Montenegro, northwest of the city of Nikšić. The mountain range extends in the Dinaric direction (NW-SE), for a length of about 40 km, parallel to the Njegoš Mountain to the south, between Nikšić and Gatačko polje, and is up to 8 km wide. The highest peak is Bajovo ždrijelo (1942 m). The highest point of the peak is located on the ridge massif of the central part of the mountain. Southeast of it is the second highest peak, Čardak (1935 m).

The mountain got its name from its bareness, i.e. the lack of forest throughout its peak area, especially on the southern side of the mountain ridge. It is built of limestone and dolomite of Cretaceous age. It is overgrown with forest, mostly on the northern side, while the southern side is barren. The ridge of the mountain is an undulating plateau suitable for walking along the peaks. The mountain slopes are quite steep, and the central part consists of flat parts, rocky outcrops and rocky ridges. The slopes towards the Piva are overgrown with dense deciduous and coniferous forests, while the southwestern ones are quite bare. Northwest of Mount Golija, to Mount Njegoš and Somina is the Golija region, known for cattle husbandry.
