= Garač =

Mountain in central Montenegro

- Гарач
- Location within Montenegro

Highest point
- Elevation: 1,436 m (4,711 ft)
- Prominence: cca. 1400 m
- Coordinates: 42°33′07″N 19°01′44″E

Geography
- Location: Montenegro
- Parent range: Dinaric Alps

Garač (Montenegrin Cyrillic: Гарач) is a mountain in central Montenegro, overlooking the city of Danilovgrad from the southwest. Its highest peak, Milunova bobija, is 1,436 meters high. Despite its relatively small height, its shape and prominence of circa 1400 meters, rising above the Zeta River Valley and Bjelopavlići, earned it the nickname "Montenegrin Kilimanjaro".

It is built of marble, limestone and dolomite, and its steep slopes are subject to erosion. The southern slopes are covered with forest, while the northern slopes are mostly barren.

== Peaks ==
Five highest peaks of Garač are:

- Milunova bobija 1,436 m (4,711 ft)
- Kaluđerova bobija 1,423 m (4,669 ft)
- Šćepanova bobija 1,375 m (4,511 ft)
- Viti krš 1,361 m (4,465 ft)
- Uljanik 1,234 m (4,049 ft)
