= Zla Kolata =

Mountain on the border of Albania and Montenegro

Zla Kolata Kolata e Keqe
- Зла Колата
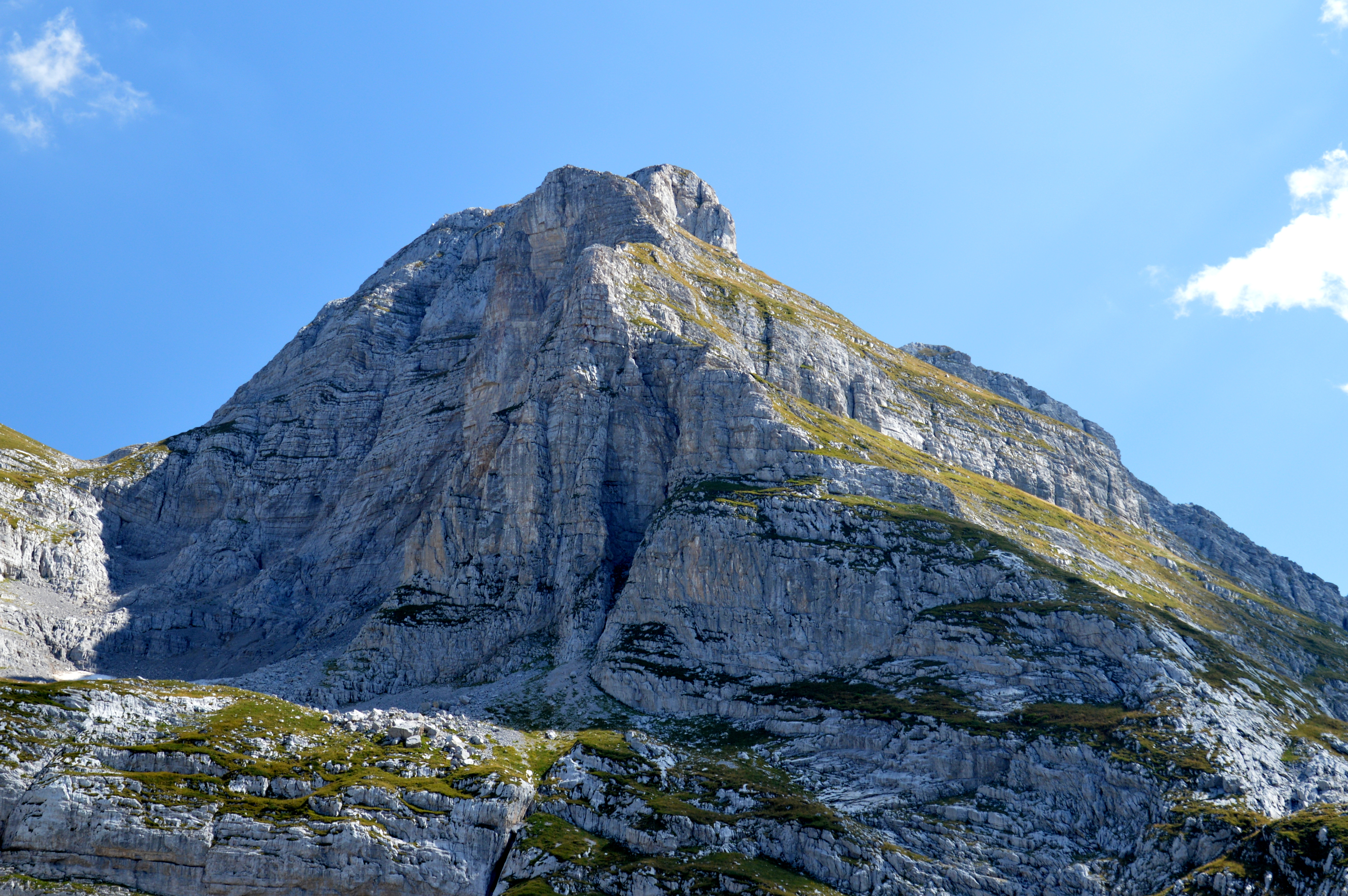
- Zla Kolata from northeast

Highest point
- Elevation: 2,534 m (8,314 ft)
- Prominence: 54 m (177 ft)
- Isolation: 0.81 km (0.50 mi)
- Listing: Country high point
- Coordinates: 42°29′06″N 19°53′50″E

Geography
- Location within Montenegro Location within Albania Location within Balkans Location within Europe
- Location: Albania - Montenegro border
- Parent range: Accursed Mountains, Dinaric Alps

Zla Kolata (Montenegrin Cyrillic: Зла Колата) or Kollata e Keqe (Albanian: Kollatë e Keqe) is one of the highest peaks of the Accursed Mountains, on the border of Albania and Montenegro.

== Description ==
Zla Kolata has an elevation of 2,534 metres (8,314 ft), making it the highest mountain in Montenegro, and the 16th highest in Albania. It is located on the border of the Gusinje municipality of Montenegro and the Tropojë district of Kukës County, Albania. Zla Kolata has an enormous summit and is a popular tourist destination in both countries. Standing half a kilometre to the northeast at 2,528 metres (8,294 ft), only slightly lower, is Kolata e Mirë or Dobre Kolata, also located on the border. The highest peak on this massif is a kilometer east-southeast of Zla Kolata and is completely on Albanian soil; it is called Rodi e Kollatës or Maja e Kollatës. It rises to 2,552 m (8,373 ft); but despite the dramatic views into the Valbona Valley, is not as often visited.
