= Majrashi =

Majrashi (Arabic: مجرشي) is an Arabic surname. Notable people with the surname include:

- Abdulaziz Majrashi (footballer, born 1991) (born 1991), Saudi Arabian footballer
- Abdullah Majrashi (footballer, born 1997)
- Eisa Majrashi (born 1986), Saudi Arabian judoka
- Faisel Majrashi (born 1984), Saudi Arabian footballer
- Naji Majrashi (born 1982), Saudi Arabian footballer
- Talal Majrashi (born 1990), Saudi Arabian footballer
