= Maja e Rosit =

Summit on the border of Albania and Montenegro

- Rosni vrh
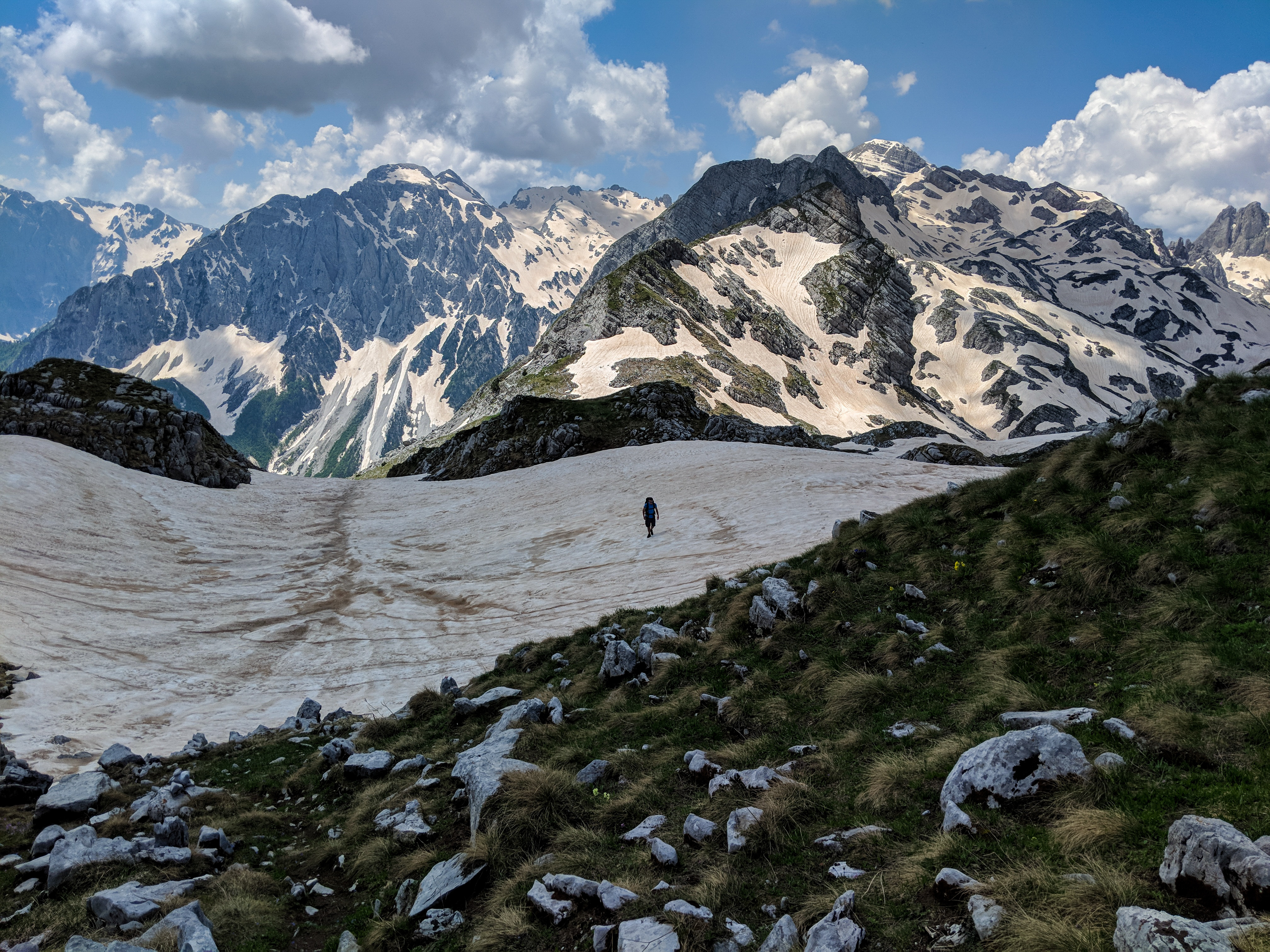
- Qafa e Rosit seen from Valbona Pass

Highest point
- Elevation: 2,525 m (8,284 ft)
- Prominence: 481 m (1,578 ft)
- Isolation: 3.8 km (2.4 mi)
- Coordinates: 42°28′46″N 19°51′03″E

Geography
- Location within Albania Location within Montenegro
- Countries: Albania; Montenegro
- Region: Albanian Alps
- Municipality: Tropojë
- Parent range: Accursed Mountains

Geology
- Rock age: Mesozoic
- Mountain type: summit
- Rock type: limestone

Maja e Rosit (Montenegrin: Rosni vrh) is a summit in the Accursed Mountains, rising to 2,525 m (8,284 ft) above sea level. It ranks as the 15th-highest peak in the range and is situated along the international boundary between Albania and Montenegro.

== Geology ==
Maja e Rosit is composed primarily of karstic limestone, typical of the Accursed Mountains. The peak displays pronounced alpine features, including jagged ridgelines, exposed rock faces and steep inclines shaped by karst processes and glacial activity.

Its vast limestone mass dominates the landscape of the region, rising above the Valbona Valley to the south and southeast and connecting via high mountain ridges to adjacent peaks that extend across the Albania–Montenegro frontier.

The name Rosni is often used in hiking and travel literature, whereas "Maja e Rosit" is the local Albanian designation.

== Climbing route ==
The most common route begins in the Alps of Albania National Park, starting from Fusha e Gjesë, near the village of Kukaj, where the last reliable water source can be found. The hiking distance to the summit is approximately 6 kilometers (3.7 miles) one way. The round-trip ascent typically takes around eight hours.

The climb starts at an elevation of roughly 947 m and culminates at 2,525 m, resulting in an elevation gain of approximately 1,605 m.

== See also ==
- List of mountains in Albania
- List of mountains in Montenegro
