= Dobra Kolata =

Mountain in Albania and Montenegro

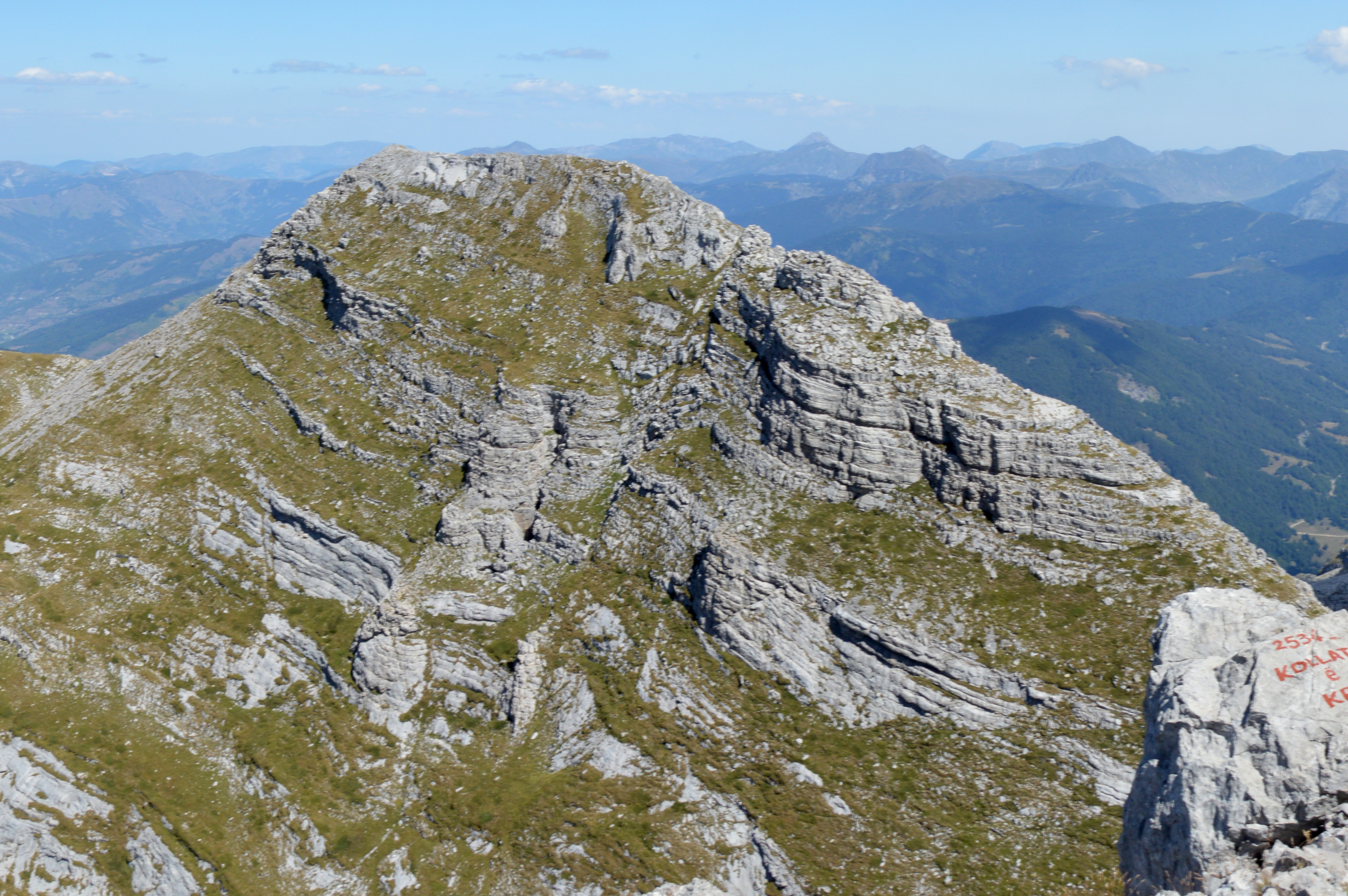
- Dobra Kolata from summit Zla Kolata

Highest point
- Elevation: 2,528 m (8,294 ft)
- Coordinates: 42.4989°N 19.9°E

Geography
- Location within Montenegro
- Countries: Montenegro; Albania

Dobra Kolata (Serbian Cyrillic: Добра Колата; Albanian: Kolata e Mirë) is a mountain in the Kolata massif located in Albania and Montenegro, part of the Accursed Mountains mountain range, standing at 2,528 m (8,294 ft) high.

== Description ==
Dobra Kolata and Zla Kolata, which is 2,534 m (8,314 ft) high and half a kilometer to the southwest, are the two peaks of the Kolata massif located on the Albania-Montenegro border. The highest peak is completely in Albanian territory and called Rodi e Kollatës. It rises 2,552 m (8,373 ft). Kolata is the second highest peak in Montenegro after its neighbour Zla Kolata.
