= Bijela gora =

Bijela Gora
- Бијела Гора
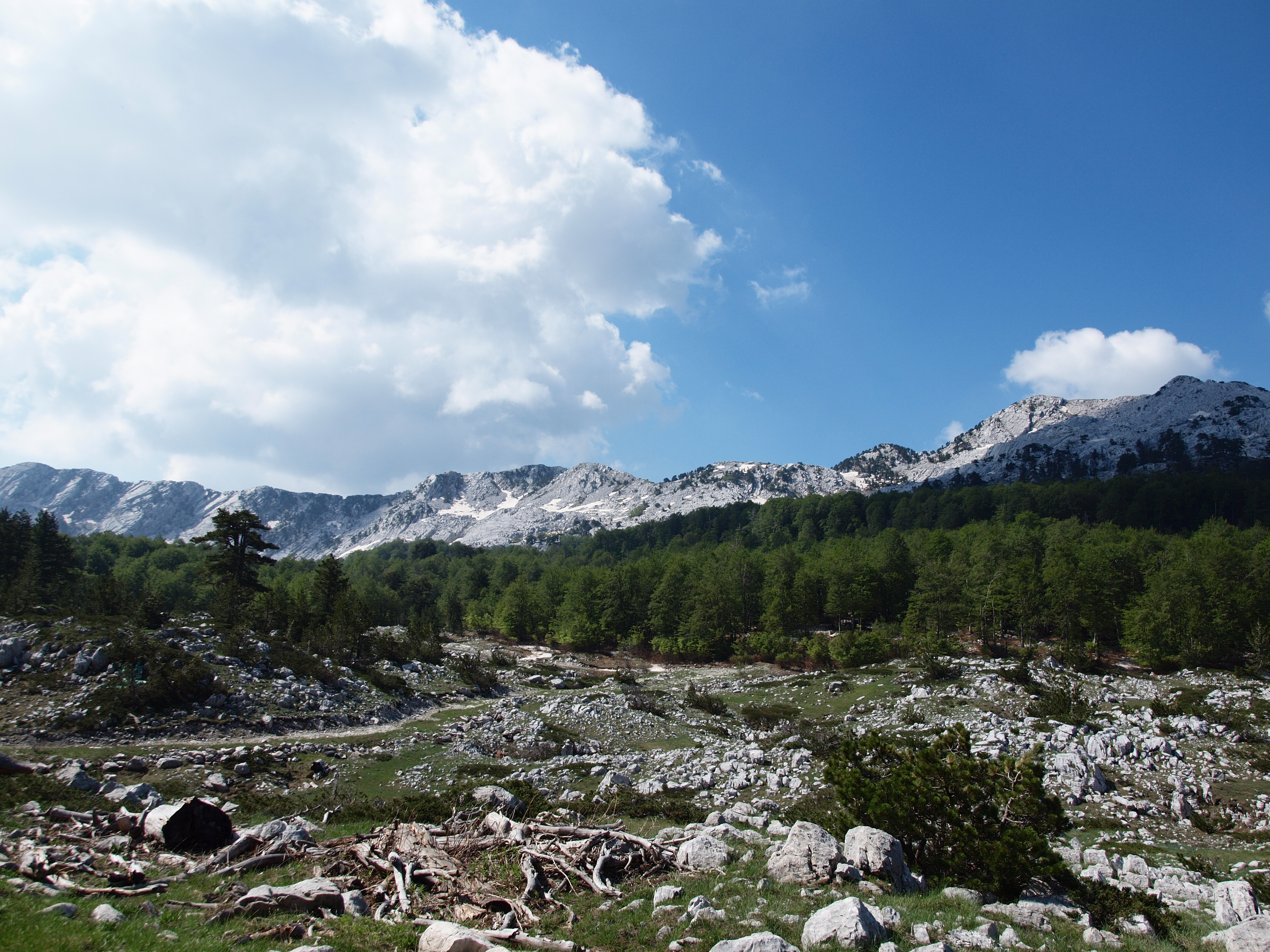

Highest point
- Elevation: 1,865 m (6,119 ft)
- Coordinates: 42°37′11.5″N 18°36′14.5″E

Geography
- Location within Montenegro
- Location: Montenegro
- Parent range: Orjen

Bijela Gora (Montenegrin Cyrillic | Бијела Гора, pronounced [bîjelaː ɡǒra], lit. "White Mountain") is a karstic high plateau between 1200–1500 m on the northern side of Mount Orjen in Montenegro. At 1862 m, Velika Jastrebica is the highest summit. It bears heavy glacial traces as a huge ice cap covered it during the last ice age.

Sparsely inhabited pastures and vast virgin beech-fir forests are major resources. Also, endemic Dinaric calcareous Silver Fir forests are found at Bijela Gora with rare endemic plants, such as Bosnian pine. Fauna of Bijela Gora includes brown bears, wolves, deer, boars, and a small population of chamois.

Bijela Gora is inhabited by Montenegrin tribes who belong to the Katun clans. Fir trees of Bijela Gora are sung about in local folk songs.
