= Njegoš Mountain =

Mountain in Montenegro

Coordinates: 42°54′N 18°45′E

- Location within Montenegro

Naming
- Language of name: Montenegrin

Njegoš (Montenegrin Cyrillic | Његош; pronounced [ɲɛ̂ɡɔʃ]) is a mountain in Montenegro. The mountain is 1,725 metres (5,659 ft) high. It is 26 km (16 mi) east to northeast from Bileća, a town about 26 km (16 mi) northwest from Nikšić. The larger part of the mountain is in vegetation, while the northern end is mostly barren.

The Petrović-Njegoš dynasty received its second name after this mountain.
