= Church of St. Mark, Užice =

Church in Užice, Serbia

Coordinates: 43.857979°N 19.847860°E

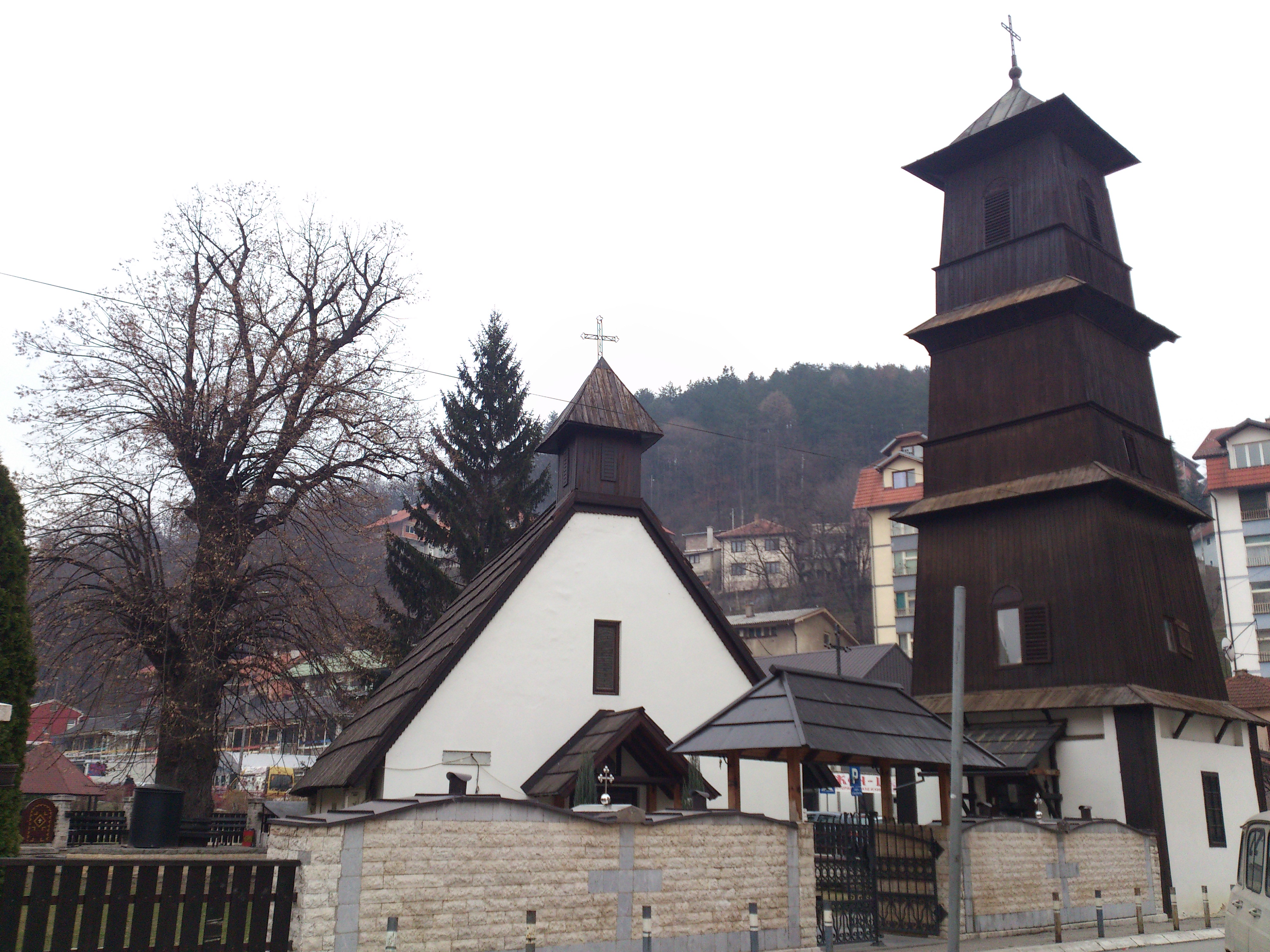
Church of St. Mark in Užice

The Church of St. Mark (Serbian: Црква Светог Марка, romanized: Crkva Svetog Marka) is a church in the town of Užice, in western Serbia. It is noted for its appearance, as an old, small, mostly wooden church in the town's modern urban setting. Originally constructed in 1721, it was rebuilt in 1828 and is the oldest surviving church in the entire Užice region. It was protected by the state in 1951 and declared a Cultural Monument of Great Importance in 1987. The church is colloquially called by the residents the Small Užice Church.

== Location ==
The church is located in the northeast section of Užice, at 41 Nikole Pašića Street. It is situated at the locality of Rakijska Pijaca ("Brandy Market") in the neighborhood called Carina ("Customs office"), or Stara Varoš ("Old Town").

== History ==
=== Original church ===
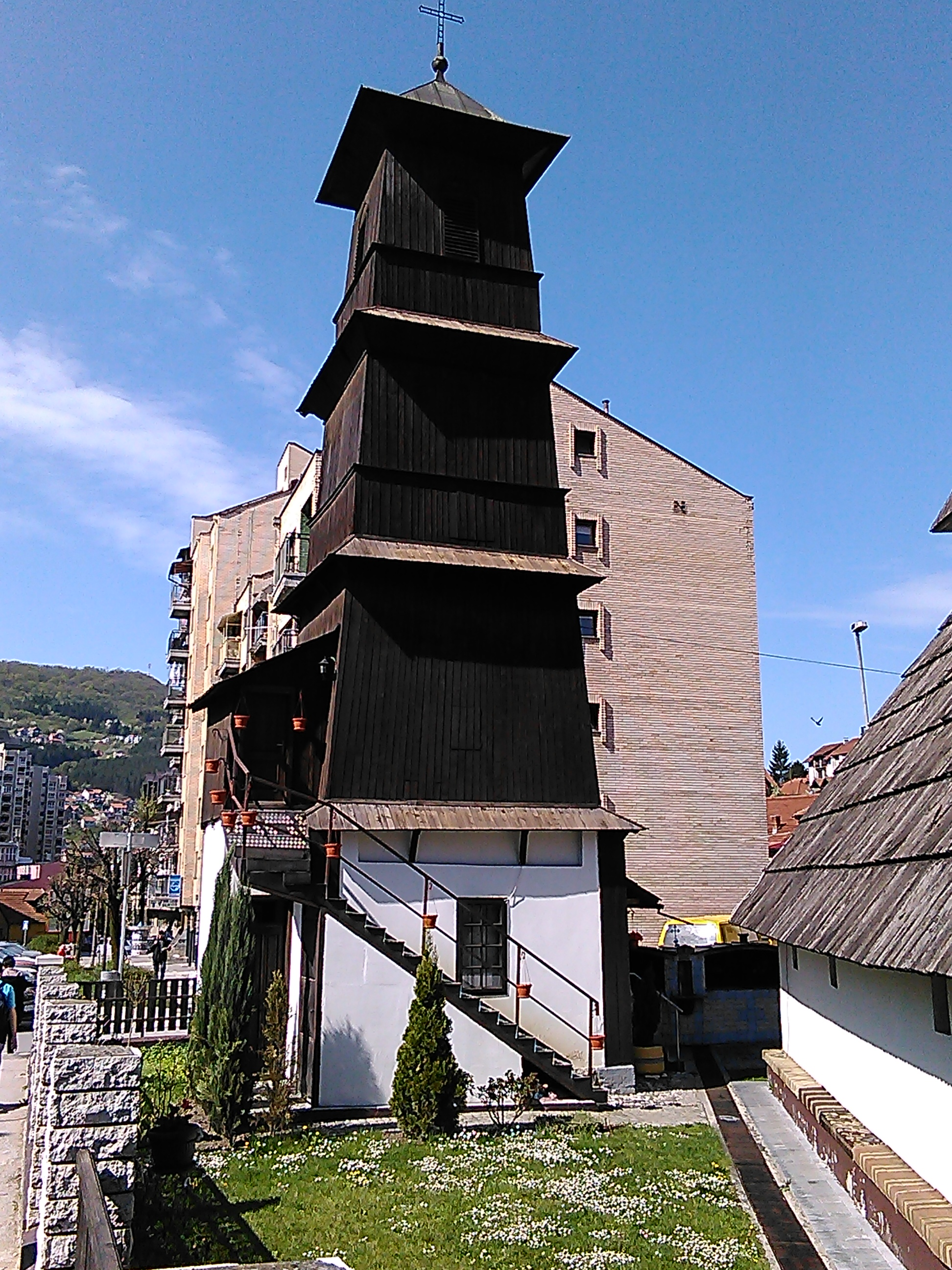
The bell tower

As an appeasement after the previous acts of oppression, the then ruling Ottomans allowed for several churches to be built in the wider Užice area. Two churches were built in the villages of Sevojno and Seča Reka, while the third was later built in Užice itself, in 1721, and dedicated to the "Holly Apostle and Evangelist Mark". It was built in the Serbian quarter of the town.

Another reason why it was allowed for the church to be built, which was forbidden by the Ottomans at the time, was the political and social situation after the 1718 Treaty of Passarowitz. Signed by the Ottoman Turkey on one, and Austrian Empire [and Venetian Republic] on the other side, it ended the Austro-Turkish war of 1716-1718 and Ottoman-Venetian war of 1714-1718. The treaty confirmed the Austrian occupation of northern Serbia, setting the new Austrian-Ottoman border close to Užice, at Crnokosa mountain, near Kosjerić. Fearing the Austrian policy of uniatism, some Orthodox Serbs fled into the Serbian regions which remained under the Ottoman rule. The border close to Užice was said to be "flooded" by the migrants, so the local Ottomans granted them certain privileges in order to populate the frontier areas, including the construction of the church.

According to the antimins which is preserved in the church's vault, the church was consecrated by the Metropolitan Grigorije of Raška. The church is also mentioned in the Chronicle of the Užice Church Municipality. Traveler Kurt Birnbaum visited the church and made a drawing of it. The church is not mentioned after 1739 and was probably demolished by the Ottomans after 1737 when Serbs supported Austria in their 1737-39 war against the Ottoman Empire.

Local administrator Sheikh Muhamed of Užice, who gave permission to the Serbs to build the church, so as some other privileges, was later punished by the higher Ottoman authorities. A dervish of the Khalwati order, he was head of the local khanqah (tekija), was known for his anti-violence speeches in the mosque, and protection of both Muslims and Christians from the violence and zulm of the Belgrade's pasha Seyid Mehmed Paşa Silahdar. A joint Muslim-Christian revolt against lawlessness broke out in Užice in 1746, headed by Sheikh Muhamed. He was slandered by his enemies to the Ottoman sultan, and Belgrade's pasha expelled him and his family to Bosnia in April 1748.

Responding that he will betray God by succumbing to Seyid's violence, he refused, so Seyid dispatched soldiers to Užice. Clashes broke out, and houses of the rioters, regardless of their religion, were burned. Muhamed escaped to the south, hiding in the village of Balotići, on the Rožaje-Prizren road, in modern Montenegro. He was apprehended by the soldiers of Mahmutbegović Pasha of Peć in the spring of 1750. They beheaded him, sent his head to Mahmutbegović, and buried his body at the execution spot.

=== Restoration ===
On the foundations of the old church, a new one was built in 1828, during the reign of Prince Miloš Obrenović. It was originally a small edifice with the steep and tall roof covered with klis - a bit longer parquet-like planks of wood, placed in several layers. The church was built in the bondruk manner - timber construction filled with unbaked bricks and mudbricks. To the west, it had a small wooden tower. It originally consisted only of naos and polygonal altar apse. In 1831-32 a narthex with the gallery was added to the object. The icons were mostly painted by Dimitrije Posinković in 1851.

During the 1885-90 reconstruction, a 22-metre-tall (72 ft) wooden bell tower was built. The lowest level is masonry made of bricks while the areas between the floors have prominent overhangs in the form of eaves made from shingle.

German traveler Felix Philipp Kanitz visited the church in 1888 during the reconstruction and wrote about it.

=== Contemporary period ===
The church soon became untended as the Church of Saint George was built in Užice, which was larger, more modern and closer to downtown.

Still, certain protective works have been done on it in 1904, 1922, 1951, 1966, mid-1970s and 1990. During these repairs the original mudbrick bondruk construction was replaced with proper bricks while the roof's klis cover was replaced with shingle. It was largely neglected in the second half of the 20th century and the services were not held. From 2004 to 2006, the church has been thoroughly refurbished: iconostasis, bell tower, floors, drinking fountain, etc. The entry section was adapted and the flower garden was arranged. This allowed for the church to be re-consecrated and the services to be reintroduced.

During the 2004-06 reconstruction, the new wooden arches were placed, so as the new floor with the underfloor heating, but the old amvon was kept. New iconostasis was placed, made by Ljuban Marić from the wood of walnut tree. Icons were made by painter Vidoje Tucović, expert in woodcut. He also worked on the bishop's throne and on the wooden eagle, used as a Gospel holder during the service.

On 8 May 2021, the Feast of Saint Mark and church's feast day, the 300th anniversary of the church was celebrated. The liturgy was held by the bishop of the Eparchy of Žiča, Justin Stefanović.

== Architecture ==
Today, the church is surrounded by the modern, high buildings.

The influence of the Islamic style of construction is visible in the decorative elements - ornaments on the northern door, divider between the naos and narthex, connection of the gallery with the bell tower, etc. The bell tower itself is described as "one of the most unusual in Serbian sacral architecture".

The church has a rich collection of icons, some of them predating the existence of the church. Especially valuable is the refined depiction of the Christ Pantocrator on golden background, in the Italo-Cretan style. There is also an icon of the Theotokos with Christ and young Saint John, made in some of the artisan shops on the Aegean coast. Both icons are from the 16th century.

Other important icons are that of the Saint Archangel Stephen, from the early 19th century, work of Simeon Lazović, and two of the prophets Isaiah and Solomon in the ovally shaped woodcut medallions, taken from the old church's doors. They are all exhibited in the vault, which consists of oak chests on the western wall. Other valuables include filigree crosses from the 19th century, silver cressets and censers, silk and velvet shrouds woven with gold, antimins from the early 18th century, etc.

On 15 August 1951 it was protected by the Institute for the protection and scientific research of the cultural monuments (decision 921/51). On 7 March 1983 it was confirmed as a cultural monument and in 1987 officially classified as the Cultural Monument of Great Importance ("State Gazette", No. 47/87).
