= Lužnica =

Lužnica may refer to:

- Lužnica, Croatia, a village in Croatia, in Zaprešić Municipality
- Lužnica, Visoko, a village in Bosnia and Herzegovina, in Visoko Municipality, Federation of Bosnia and Herzegovina
- Lužnica, Podgorica, a village in Montenegro, in Podgorica Municipality
- Lužnica, Suva Reka, a village in Kosovo, in Suva Reka Municipality
- Lužnica (region), region in Serbia
- Lužnica (river), river in Serbia, tributary of Vlasina
- Lužnica (Skrapež), river in Serbia, tributary of Skrapež
