= Cikote =

Cikote may refer to:

- Cikote (Kosjerić), a village in Kosjerić, Serbia
- Cikote (Loznica), a village in Loznica, Serbia
