= Mionica (disambiguation) =

Mionica may refer to the following places:

== Bosnia and Herzegovina ==
- Mionica (Gradačac), village in the municipality of Gradačac

== Serbia ==
- Mionica, town and municipality located in the Kolubara District
- Mionica (village), village situated in Mionica municipality
- Mionica (Kosjerić), village in the municipality of Kosjerić
