= Slobodan Gojković =

Serbian politician

- Слободан Гојковић

Member of the National Assembly of the Republic of Serbia
- In office 3 December 2009 – 31 May 2012

Personal details
- Born: 29 September 1951 (age 74)
- Party: DS (until c. 2012); ZZS (c. 2012-?); SDS (current)

Slobodan Gojković (Serbian Cyrillic: Слободан Гојковић; born 29 September 1951) is a Serbian politician. He served in the Serbian parliament from 2009 to 2012 and has held high municipal office in Prijepolje. A member of the Democratic Party (DS) for many years, he later joined Boris Tadić's breakaway Social Democratic Party (SDS).

== Early life and career ==
Gojković is a graduated sociologist and has worked at the National Employment Service in Prijepolje. In the 1990s, he was director of the municipality's House of Revolution.

== Politician ==
=== Democratic Party ===
Serbia introduced the direct election of mayors for the 2004 Serbian local elections, and Gojković ran as the Democratic Party's mayoral candidate in Prijepolje. He was defeated, finishing fifth in the first round of voting. He also led the party's electoral list in the concurrent election for the municipal assembly and was elected when the list won six seats. The Democratic Party joined a local coalition government after the election, and Gojković served as vice-president (i.e., deputy speaker) of the assembly for the term that followed.

Gojković also received the forty-ninth position on the Democratic Party's list in the 2007 Serbian parliamentary election. The list won sixty-four seats, and he was not given a mandate. (From 2000 to 2011, all mandates in Serbian parliamentary election were assigned to candidates on successful lists at the discretion of the sponsoring parties and coalitions, irrespective of numerical order. Gojković's position on the list had no specific bearing on his chances of election.)

The Democratic Party contested the 2008 parliamentary election as the main party in an alliance called For a European Serbia (ZES). Gojković appeared in the forty-first position on the list (which was mostly alphabetical) and did not immediately receive a mandate after the list won 102 seats. The election did not produce a clear winner, but after protracted negotiations the ZES alliance formed a new coalition government at the republican level with the Socialist Party of Serbia (SPS).

The direct election of mayors proved to be a short-lived experiment and was abandoned with the 2008 Serbian local elections, which took place concurrently with the parliamentary vote. Since this time, mayors have been chosen by the elected members of the local assemblies. Gojković appeared in the second position on the DS's list in Prijepolje for the first 2008 local vote; the list won five seats. Because the local government was not constituted by the legal deadline, a repeat election was held in November 2008. For this vote, the DS and SPS ran on a combined list, which also included G17 Plus and the Serbian Renewal Movement (SPO). Gojković was given the third position on the list and was assigned a mandate after it won nine seats. The DS–SPS alliance joined a new local coalition government after the election, and Gojković led the alliance's assembly group.

==== Parliamentarian ====
Gojković was given a parliamentary mandate on 3 December 2009 as a replacement for fellow DS member Dragan Vujadinović, who had resigned. He served in the national assembly as a government supporter. Gojković was a member of the labour committee (Note: Formally known as the Committee on Labour, Veterans, and Social Affairs.) and the privatization committee; a deputy member of the industry committee, the committee for Kosovo and Metohija, and the gender equality committee; and a member of the parliamentary friendship groups with Bosnia and Herzegovina, Croatia, Montenegro, Slovakia, and Slovenia.

Serbia's electoral laws were reformed in 2011, such that all mandates in elections held under proportional representation were assigned to candidates on successful lists in numerical order. Gojković appeared in the 133rd position on the DS's Choice for a Better Life list in the 2012 Serbian parliamentary election and was not re-elected when the list fell to sixty-seven seats.

=== Together for Serbia/Social Democratic Party ===
The DS and the SPS continued their alliance in Prijepolje for the 2012 Serbian local elections, which took place concurrently with the parliamentary vote. Gojković appeared in the fifth position on their combined list and was re-elected when it won nine seats. A somewhat unusual governing coalition came to power after the election, comprising the Sandžak Democratic Party (SDP)–Social Democratic Party of Serbia (SDPS) alliance, the Party of Democratic Action of Sandžak (SDA S), the DS, the far-right Serbian Radical Party (SRS), and the Democratic Party of Serbia (DSS).

Gojković subsequently left the Democratic Party and served as an independent member in the assembly. At some point, in the 2012–16 term, he became the leader of the Prijepolje municipal board of Together for Serbia (ZZS), a party that had broken away from the DS in late 2012.

Together for Serbia contested the 2014 Serbian parliamentary election as part of former DS leader Boris Tadić's alliance. Gojković appeared in the 241st position (out of 250) on their list, apparently as a ZZS candidate. Election from this position was a mathematical impossibility, and he was not elected when the list won eighteen seats.

Gojković supported Prijepolje's new coat of arms, which included symbols of importance to both the Serb and Bosniak communities, in early 2016.

Together for Serbia contested the 2016 local elections in Prijepolje in an alliance with the SRS and the DSS; some DS candidates also appeared on their combined list. Gojković appeared in the fourth position on the list and was not re-elected when it won three seats, bringing his tenure in the municipal assembly to an end.

Gojković subsequently joined Tadić's Social Democratic Party and appeared in the forty-seventh position on its list in the 2022 Serbian parliamentary election. The list did not cross the electoral threshold for assembly representation. The SDS later contested the 2023 Serbian parliamentary election in an alliance with Enough Is Enough (DJB), and Gojković appeared in the ninety-third position on their combined list. This list, too, did not cross the threshold.

== Electoral record ==
=== Local (Prijepolje) ===
2004 Prijepolje municipal election: Mayor of Prijepolje
Candidate	Party	First round		Second round	
Candidate	Party	Votes	%	Votes	%
Mr. Nedžad Turković	Sandžak Democratic Party–Rasim Ljajić	3,148	19.68	7,396	70.72
Aziz Hadžifejzović	"List for Sandžak Dr. Sulejman Ugljanin" (Affiliation: Party of Democratic Action of Sandžak)	2,816	17.61	3,062	29.28
Branko Ćubić Ćuba	Serbian Radical Party–Tomislav Nikolić	2,634	16.47		
Vukosav Tomašević	Democratic Party of Serbia–Vojislav Koštunica	2,597	16.24		
Slobodan Gojković	Democratic Party–Boris Tadić	1,096	6.85		
Budimir Tešević Bude	Social Democracy	968	6.05		
Milan Gačević	New Serbia–Velimir Ilić	802	5.01		
Dragomir Malešić	Citizens' Group: For Prijepolje	557	3.48		
Dragan Ćosović	Socialist Party of Serbia	550	3.44		
Prof. Dr. Milan Martinović Mišo	Social Democratic Party	307	1.92		
Veka Radonjić	Strength of Serbia Movement–Bogoljub Karić	225	1.41		
Nebojša Žunić	Serbian Renewal Movement	185	1.16		
Slobodan Martinović	G17 Plus–Miroljub Labus	110	0.69		
Total		15,995	100.00	10,458	100.00
Valid votes		15,995	98.62	10,458	97.56
Invalid/blank votes		223	1.38	262	2.44
Total votes		16,218	100.00	10,720	100.00
Registered voters/turnout		33,894	47.85	33,895	31.63
