= Galovići =

- Village
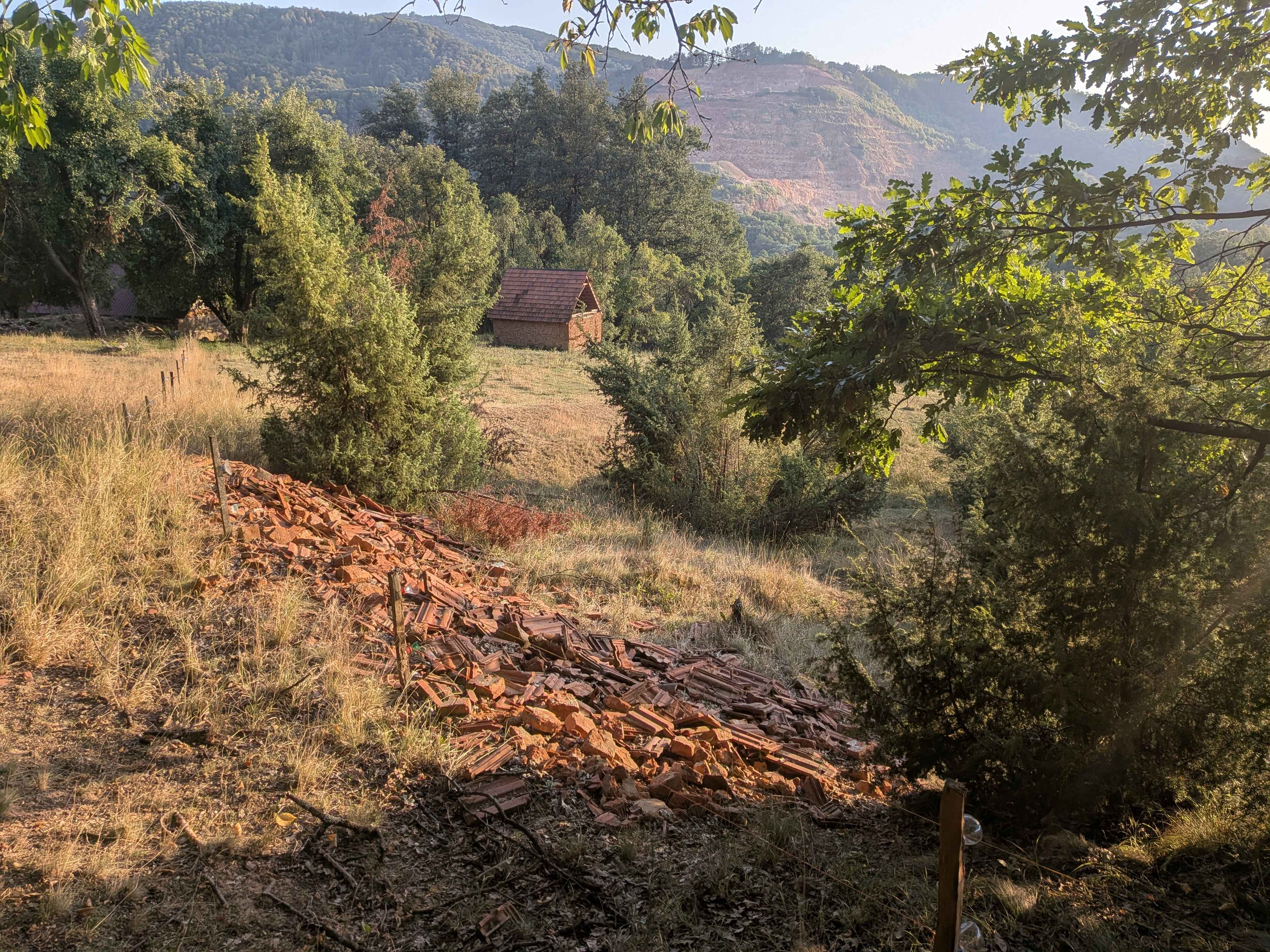
- Traditional rural house, 2026

- Location within Serbia
- Coordinates: 44°01′N 19°53′E
- Country: Serbia
- District: Zlatibor District
- Municipality: Kosjerić

Population (2002)
  - Total: 263
- Time zone: UTC+1 (CET)
  - Summer (DST): UTC+2 (CEST)

Galovići is a village in the municipality of Kosjerić, western Serbia. The village has a population of 166 people (2022 census) and is a cadastral municipality with a cement factory.

== Demographics ==
According to the 2022 census, the village has a population of 166 people. Since 1953, a population decline has been observed.

== Environment and geography ==
Historical population
Year	Pop.	±% p.a.
1948	423	—
1953	451	+1.29%
1961	417	−0.97%
1971	371	−1.16%
1981	361	−0.27%
1991	301	−1.80%
2002	263	−1.22%
2011	209	−2.52%
2022	166	−2.07%

Galovići is located northwest of the town of Kosjerić in the municipality of the same name in Western Serbia. The Skrapež River passes through Galovići. Brown soils on limestone are common near the river. A cadastral municipality, a cement factory operates within the borders of the village.

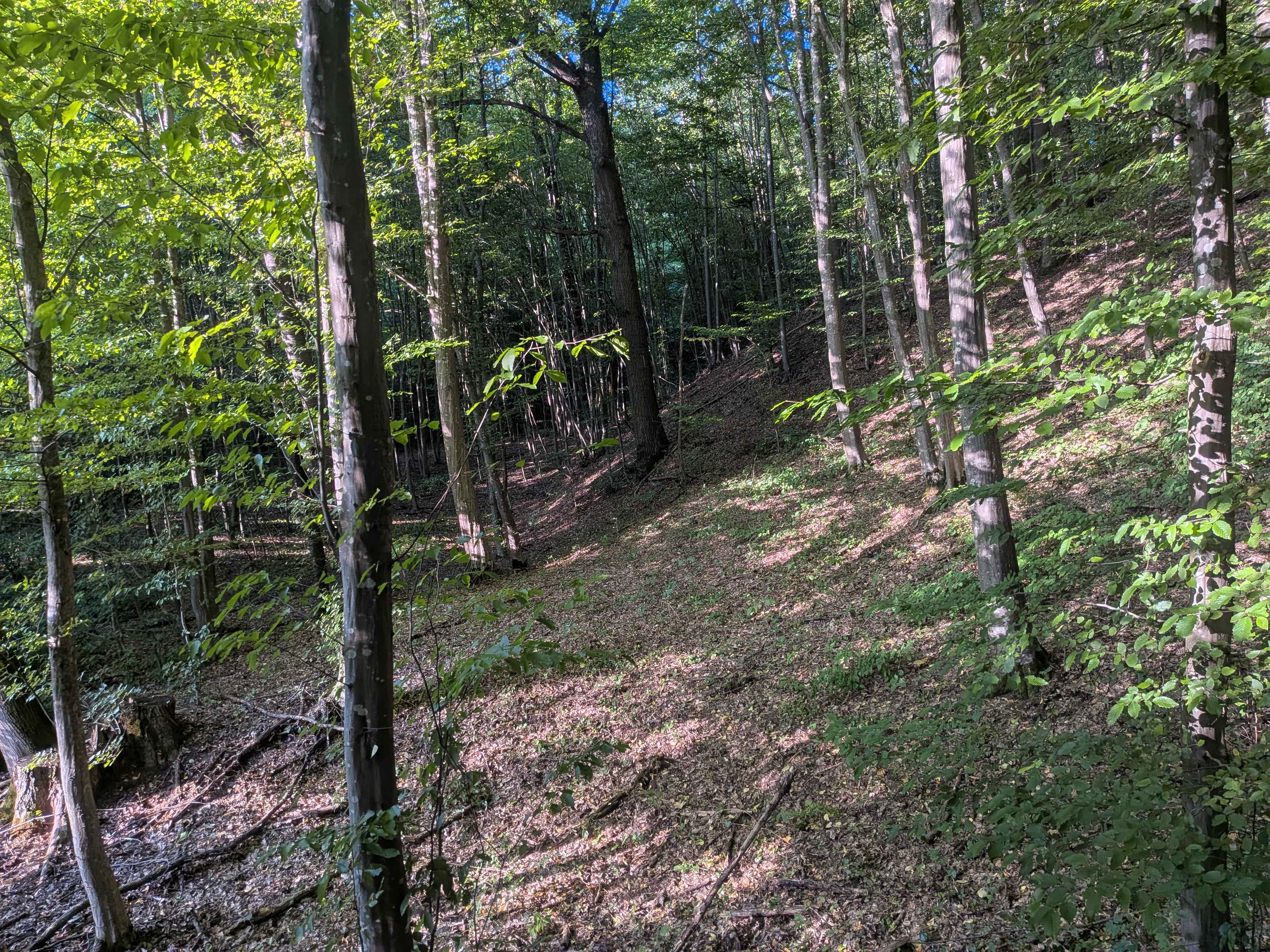
A forest in Galovići

=== Flood ===
In 2018, a severe rainstorm flooded local communities in Kosjerić, including Galovići. According to the mayor of Kosjerić, Žarko Đokić, the water washed away roads in the village that were repaired two months prior.
