= Dragan Vujadinović =

Serbian politician, economist, and journalist (1953–2021)

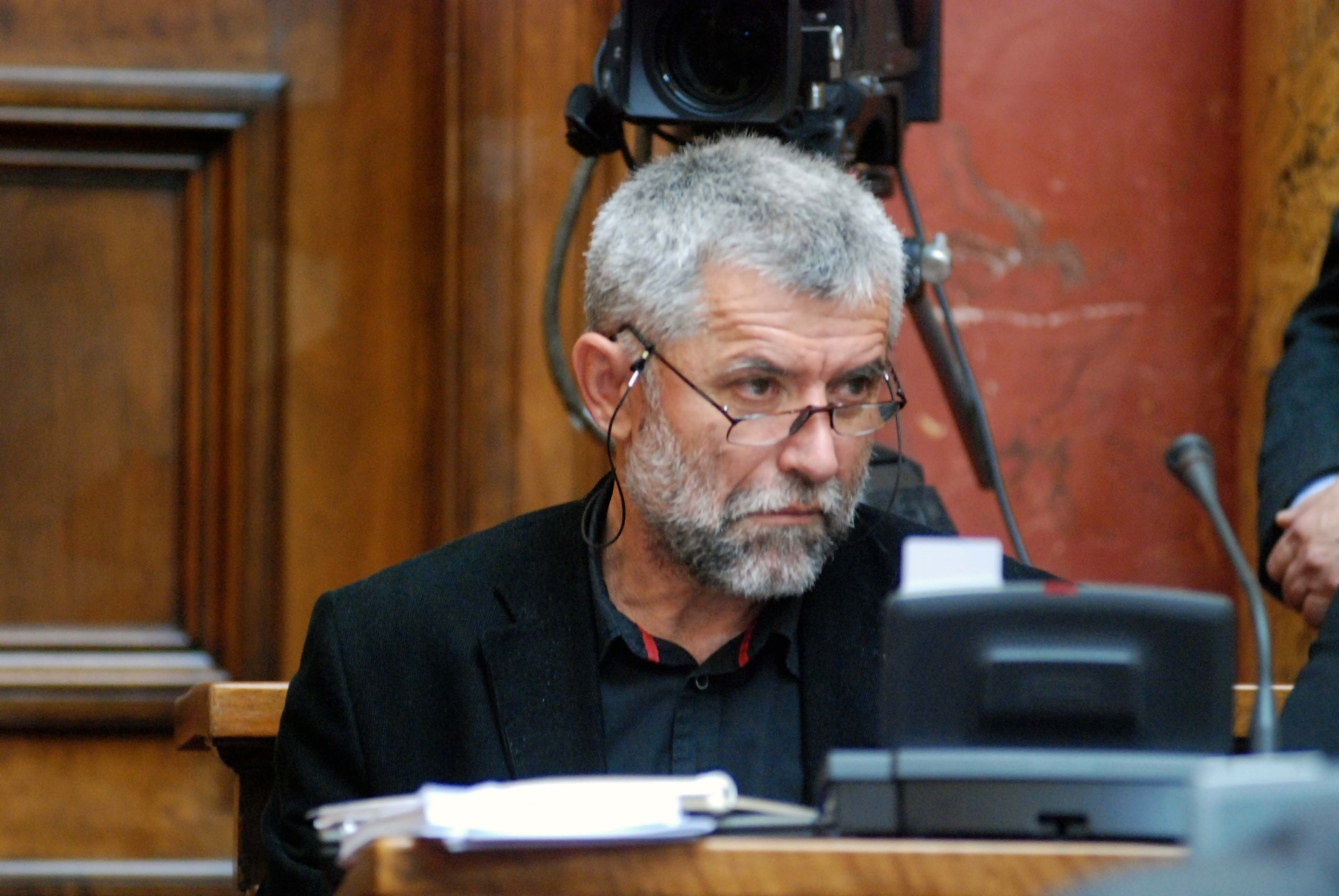

Dragan Vujadinović (Serbian Cyrillic: Драган Вујадиновић; 16 December 1953 – 23 December 2021) was a Serbian politician, economist, and journalist. He served in the National Assembly of Serbia from 2007 to 2009 and was the mayor of Kosjerić from 2009 to 2012. Originally with the Democratic Party (Demokratska stranka, DS), he was later a member of the breakaway Social Democratic Party (Socijaldemokratska stranka, SDS).

== Early life and career ==
Vujadinović was born in Rosići, Kosjerić, in what was then the People's Republic of Serbia in the Federal People's Republic of Yugoslavia. He held a master's degree from the University of Belgrade Faculty of Economics. He worked at Valjaonica bakra Sevojno from 1977 to 1990 and held managerial jobs in the copper sector from 1997 to 1999 and again from 2004 to 2007. He was also director of RTV Studio B's economic and legal department in the 1990s. He resigned from the latter position in October 1997 as part of a large-scale protest against the Belgrade city government's dismissal of the station's leadership, which occurred after the breakup of the Zajedno political coalition in the city and Zoran Đinđić's removal as mayor.

Vujadinović was a frequent contributor to Danas, Blic, and other media outlets, writing on economic issues. As of 2018, his essays had been compiled into five published books.

== Politician ==
Vujadinović received the forty-first position on the DS's electoral list in the 2007 Serbian parliamentary election. The list won sixty-four seats, and Vujadinović was included in his party's delegation. (From 2000 to 2011, parliamentary mandates were awarded to sponsoring parties or coalitions rather than to individual candidates, and it was common practice for the parties to distribute their mandates out of numerical order. Vujadinović's position on the list – which was in any event mostly alphabetical, the letter "V" appearing close to the start of the Serbian alphabet – had no bearing on whether he received a mandate.) The DS formed an unstable coalition government with the rival Democratic Party of Serbia (Demokratska stranka Srbije, DSS) and G17 Plus after the election, and Vujadinović served as a supporter of the ministry. In September 2007, he wrote an opinion piece for Danas about the corrosive effects of television on assembly debates.

The DS–DSS alliance fell apart in early 2008, and a new election was called. Vujadinović received the twenty-sixth position on the DS's For a European Serbia list and was given a mandate for a second term when the list won 102 seats. The overall election results were initially inconclusive; following extended negotiations, For a European Serbia formed a new coalition government with the Socialist Party of Serbia, and Vujadinović again served as a government supporter.

Vujadinović resigned his parliamentary mandate on 3 December 2009, having been selected as mayor of Kosjerić earlier in the year. He held the mayoral position until 2012, when a new alignment of parties in the municipal assembly brought about his removal from office. In March 2011, he signed a contract with Belgrade's Tek Energy to develop hydropower plants in the municipality.

Serbia's electoral system was reformed in 2011, such that parliamentary mandates were awarded in numerical order to candidates on successful lists. Vujadinović received the 131st position on the DS's Choice for a Better Life list in the 2012 parliamentary election and, as the list won only sixty-seven mandates, was not returned to parliament.

The DS experienced a serious split in early 2014, with former leader Boris Tadić setting up a new breakaway group that was originally called the New Democratic Party. This party contested the 2014 Serbian parliamentary election in a fusion with the Greens of Serbia and in alliance with other parties. Vujadinović sided with Tadić in the split and received the thirty-eighth position on the coalition list; he missed re-election when the list won eighteen seats. The New Democratic Party re-constituted itself as the Social Democratic Party later in the year.

The SDS participated in the 2016 parliamentary election in an alliance with the Liberal Democratic Party and the League of Social Democrats of Vojvodina. Vujadinović again received the thirty-eighth position on their combined list and was not elected when the list won thirteen mandates.

== Death ==
Vujadinović died in Kragujevac on 23 December 2021, at the age of sixty-eight, following a short illness.
