= Ševrljuge =

- Village
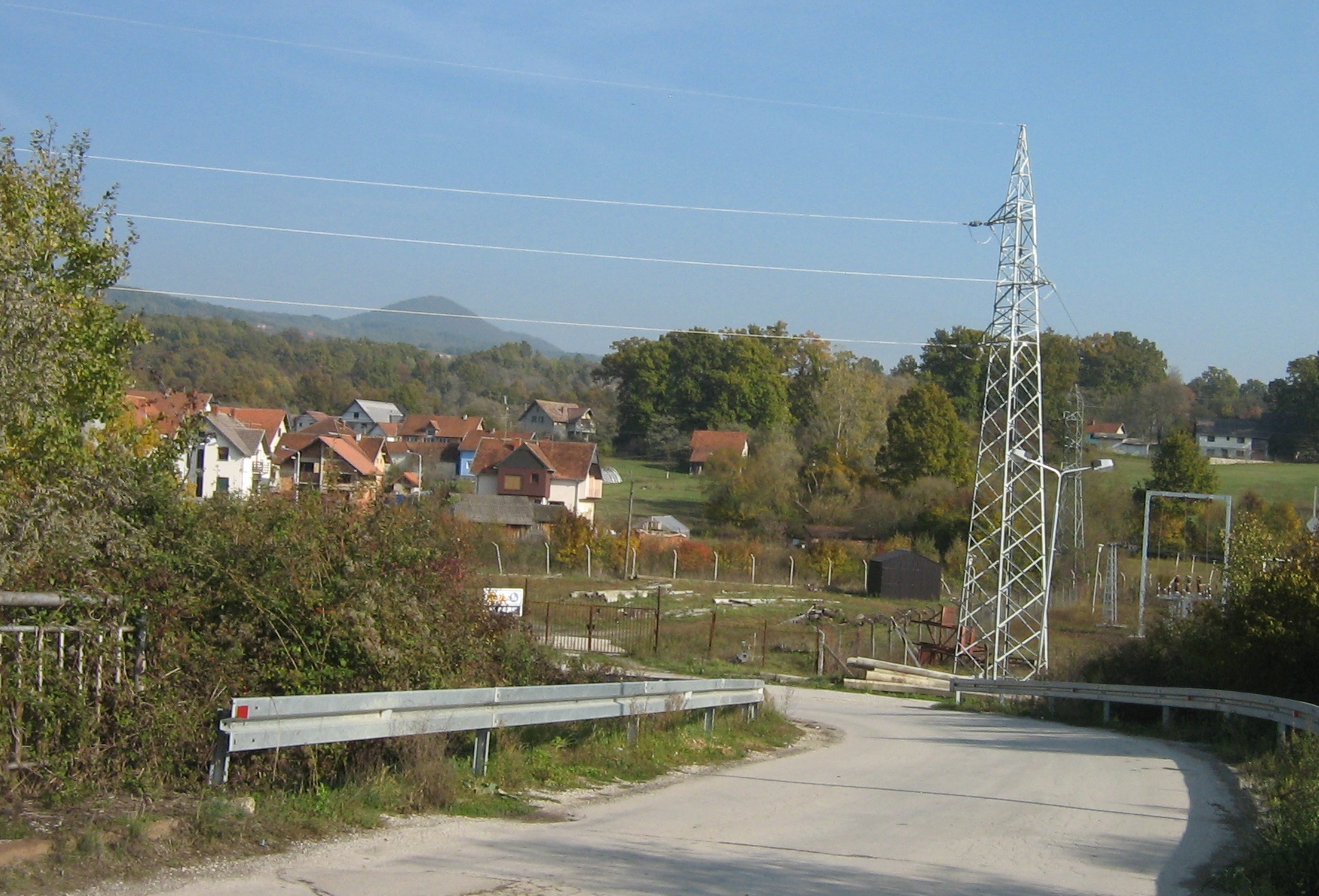

- Location within Serbia
- Coordinates: 44°00′N 19°58′E
- Country: Serbia
- District: Zlatibor District
- Municipality: Kosjerić

Population (2002)
  - Total: 334
- Time zone: UTC+1 (CET)
  - Summer (DST): UTC+2 (CEST)

Ševrljuge is a village in the municipality of Kosjerić, western Serbia. According to the 2002 census, the village has a population of 334 people.
