= Tubići =

Tubići Тубићи
- Village
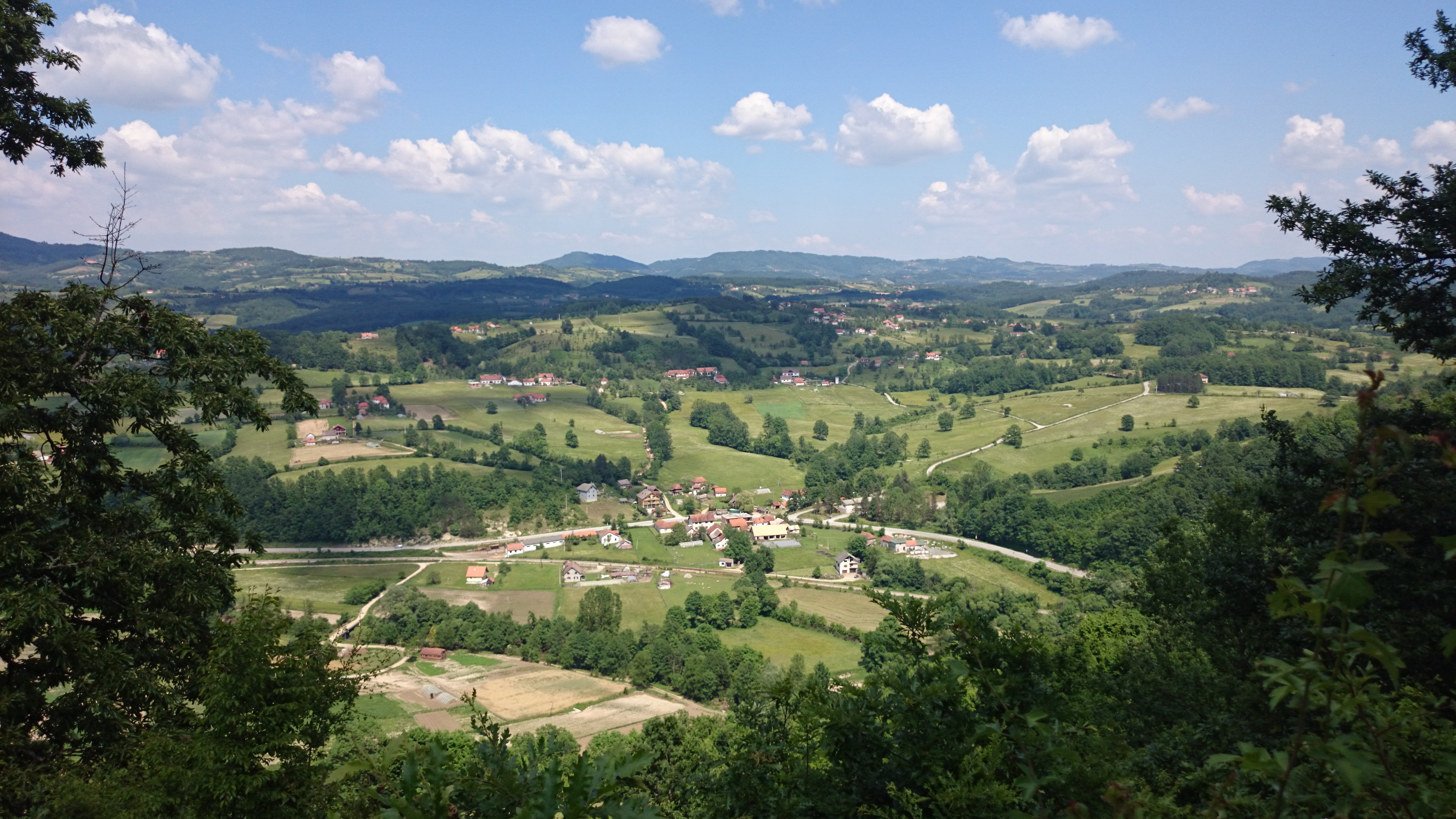
- Tubići in 2014

- Location within Serbia
- Coordinates: 43°58′N 19°56′E
- Country: Serbia
- District: Zlatibor District
- Municipality: Kosjerić
- Elevation: 473 m (1,552 ft)

Population (2011)
  - Total: 449
- Time zone: UTC+1 (CET)
  - Summer (DST): UTC+2 (CEST)

Tubići (Serbian Cyrillic: Тубићи) is a village in the municipality of Kosjerić, western Serbia. According to the 2011 census, the village has a population of 449 inhabitants.
