= Godljevo =

- Village
- Location within Serbia
- Coordinates: 44°01′N 19°50′E
- Country: Serbia
- District: Zlatibor District
- Municipality: Kosjerić

Population (2002)
  - Total: 348
- Time zone: UTC+1 (CET)
  - Summer (DST): UTC+2 (CEST)

Godljevo is a village in the municipality of Kosjerić, western Serbia. According to the 2002 census, the village has a population of 348 people.
