= Brajkovići (Kosjerić) =

Coordinates: 44.0275°N 19.9119°E

- Village
- Interactive map of Brajkovići
- Country: Serbia
- District: Zlatibor District
- Municipality: Kosjerić

Population (2002)
  - Total: 724
- Time zone: UTC+1 (CET)
  - Summer (DST): UTC+2 (CEST)

Brajkovići is a village in the municipality of Kosjerić, western Serbia. According to the 2002 census, the village has a population of 724 people.
