= Godečevo =

- Village
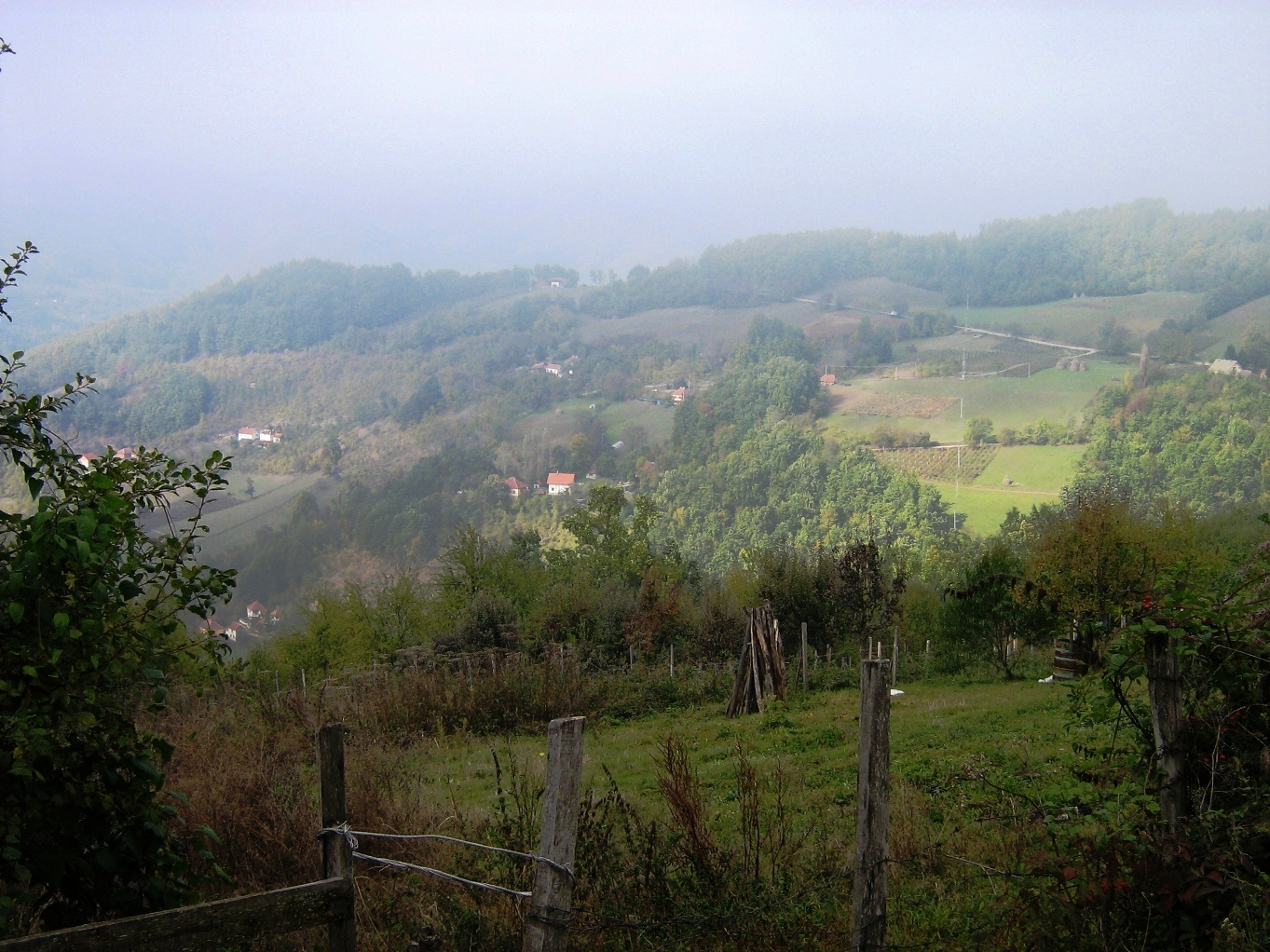

- Location within Serbia
- Coordinates: 44°03′N 19°43′E
- Country: Serbia
- District: Zlatibor District
- Municipality: Kosjerić

Population (2002)
  - Total: 599
- Time zone: UTC+1 (CET)
  - Summer (DST): UTC+2 (CEST)

Godečevo is a village in the municipality of Kosjerić in western Serbia. The village is 100 km southwest of Belgrade. Godečevo is 837 meters above sea level, and has 599 inhabitants. According to the 2002 census, the village has a population of 599 people. There are 104 people per square kilometer around Godečevo.

== Geography ==
The territory around Godečevo is hilly. The highest point is Lisin with height of 1,125 meters above sea level which is located 3.8 km north of Godečevo. The nearest town is Bajina Bašta, which is located 16.4 km southwest of Godečevo. The fields around Godečevo are almost covered by fields. In the region around Godečevo, the mountains are remarkably common.

== Climate ==
The average climate is 10 °C for the village. Oceanic climate dominates in the territory of Godečevo. July is the warmest month in Godečevo with the temperature of 32 °C in July and the coldest is January with the temperature of is -3 °C in. The average rainfall is 1,224 millimeters per year.
