= Kosjerić (village) =

Coordinates: 44.0047°N 19.8978°E

- Village
- Interactive map of Kosjerić (village)
- Country: Serbia
- District: Zlatibor District
- Municipality: Kosjerić

Population (2002)
  - Total: 1,023
- Time zone: UTC+1 (CET)
  - Summer (DST): UTC+2 (CEST)

Kosjerić is a village in the municipality of Kosjerić, western Serbia. According to the 2002 census, the village has a population of 1023 people.
