= Drenovci, Serbia =

Drenovci (Kosjerić)
- Village
- Location within Serbia
- Coordinates: 44°04′N 19°52′E
- Country: Serbia
- District: Zlatibor District
- Municipality: Kosjerić

Population (2002)
  - Total: 395
- Time zone: UTC+1 (CET)
  - Summer (DST): UTC+2 (CEST)

Drenovci is a village in the municipality of Kosjerić, western Serbia. According to the 2002 census, the village has a population of 395 people.
