= Crnokosa =

Mountain in Serbia

- Location within Serbia

Highest point
- Elevation: 809 m (2,654 ft)
- Coordinates: 43°58′03″N 19°54′59″E

Geography
- Location: Western Serbia
- Parent range: Dinaric Alps

Crnokosa (Serbian Cyrillic: Црнокоса) is a mountain in western Serbia, near the town of Kosjerić. Its highest peak Šarampov has an elevation of 809 m (2,654 ft) above sea level. It runs around 9 km along the Skrapež river, steeply closing its southern valley, while its southern slopes are milder.

== See also ==
- List of mountains in Serbia
