= Vukosav Tomašević =

Serbian politician

Vukosav Tomašević (Serbian Cyrillic: Вукосав Томашевић; born 4 October 1958) is a Serbian entrepreneur, brandy producer, and politician. He served in the Serbian parliament on an almost uninterrupted basis from 2001 to 2007, was also a member of the federal assembly of Serbia and Montenegro in 2003–04, and has held high municipal office in Prijepolje. For most of his political career, Tomašević was a member of the Democratic Party of Serbia (DSS).

== Early life and private career ==
Tomašević was born in Prijepolje, in what was then the People's Republic of Serbia in the Federal People's Republic of Yugoslavia. He graduated in journalism from the University of Belgrade Faculty of Political Sciences and worked as a journalist until 1997. He was a board member of the Serbian Radio Stations Association and a member of the programming committee of Radio Television of Serbia.

In 1989, Tomašević was a founder of company Tomašević Brothers, which initially operated in the field of hospitality. The company began producing brandy in 2010 with the Ognjena brand. Tomašević has served as president of the association of brandy producers Serbian Brandy. In 2021, he said that illegal sales of brandy in Serbia were damaging both the state and legitimate producers.

== Politician ==
Tomasević joined the Democratic Party of Serbia in 1996 and was for many years the leader of its municipal board in Prijepolje.

=== Parliamentarian ===
In 2000, the DSS joined the Democratic Opposition of Serbia (DOS), a broad and ideologically diverse coalition of parties opposed to Slobodan Milošević's administration. DOS candidate (and DSS leader) Vojislav Koštunica defeated Milošević in the 2000 Yugoslavian presidential election, and Milošević fell from power on 5 October 2000. Serbia's government also fell after Milošević's defeat in the Yugoslavian vote, and a new Serbian parliamentary election took place in December 2000. Prior to the vote, Serbia's electoral laws were reformed such that the entire country became a single at-large electoral district and all mandates were assigned to candidates on successful lists at the discretion of the sponsoring parties and coalitions, irrespective of numerical order.

Tomašević appeared in the ninety-seventh position on the DOS's electoral list in the 2000 Serbian parliamentary election and was awarded a mandate after the list won a landslide majority victory with 176 seats. He took his seat when the assembly convened in January 2001. In the assembly, he served on the committee on culture and information.

The DSS broke away from the Democratic Opposition of Serbia in late 2001. On 12 June 2002, the Serbian parliament's administrative committee accepted the DOS's request to revoke the mandates of several DSS representatives, including Tomašević; the technical reason for their dismissal was low attendance, but it was accepted that the DOS leadership was attempting to weaken the DSS's presence in the assembly. Their dismissal was later overturned on technical grounds, and their mandates were restored.

In early 2003, the Federal Republic of Yugoslavia was reconstituted as the State Union of Serbia and Montenegro. The new country had a unicameral parliament, and its first members were chosen via indirect election by the republican parliaments of Serbia and Montenegro; only sitting members of the republican parliaments and outgoing members of the old federal parliament were eligible to serve. By virtue of its standing in the Serbian parliament, the DSS had the right to appoint seventeen members to the federal body. Tomašević was included in his party's federal delegation when it was chosen on 25 February 2003. He also continued to serve in the republican parliament.

The DSS contested the 2003 Serbian parliamentary election with its own list, and Tomašević appeared in the sixty-second position. The list won fifty-three seats. He was not initially included in his party's delegation, but he was awarded a seat on 12 February 2004 as the replacement for another party representative. His term the federal parliament ended at the same time. During his second term, he once again served on the culture and information committee and was also a member of the committee on interethnic relations. The DSS was the dominant party in Serbia's coalition government after the 2003 election, and Tomašević served as a supporter of the administration.

Serbia introduced the direct election of mayors in the 2004 Serbian local elections. Tomašević ran as the DSS's candidate in Prijepolje and was defeated in the first round, finishing in fourth place.

The DSS contested the 2007 Serbian parliamentary election in an alliance with New Serbia (NS), and Tomašević appeared in the eighty-third position on their combined list. The list won forty-seven seats, and he was not given a mandate for a third term. In the 2008 parliamentary election, he appeared in the 116th position on a follow-up DSS–NS list; the list fell to thirty seats, and he was again not given a mandate.

=== Local official ===
The direct election of mayors proved to be a short-lived experiment and was abandoned with the 2008 local election cycle; since this time, mayors have been chosen by the elected members of the local assemblies.

The DSS contested the 2008 local election in Prijepolje in an alliance with both New Serbia and the far-right Serbian Radical Party (SRS); Tomašević appeared in the second position on their combined list, which won twenty-five seats. The assembly did not form a government in the required time after the election, and a new local election was called for November 2008. This time, the DSS and NS contested the election without the Radicals; Tomašević led their combined list, which won four seats. The Sandžak Democratic Party (SDP), the Democratic Party (DS), the Socialist Party of Serbia (SPS), and the Serbian Progressive Party (SNS) formed a new local coalition government after the election. Tomašević served in the assembly as an opposition member.

Serbia's electoral laws were reformed again in 2011, such that all mandates in elections held under proportional representation were assigned to candidates on successful lists in numerical order. Tomašević appeared in the thirty-fifth position on the DSS's list in the 2012 Serbian parliamentary election and was not elected when the list won twenty-one seats. In the concurrent 2012 local elections, the DSS and SRS once again formed an alliance in Prijepolje; he appeared in the second position on their combined list and was re-elected to the municipal assembly when the list won eight seats. After the election, a somewhat unusual governing coalition came together comprising the SDP–Social Democratic Party of Serbia (SDPS) alliance, the Party of Democratic Action of Sandžak (SDA S), the DS, the SRS, and the DSS. When the assembly convened on 4 July 2012, Tomašević was chosen as its president (i.e., speaker).

Prijepolje held a ceremony to commemorate the victims of the Štrpci massacre in February 2013. Tomašević spoke at the event, stressing that "every crime is individual" and that the Serb community in Prijepolje bore no collective guilt for the atrocity, notwithstanding the efforts of some to manipulate the commemoration for sectarian ends. His comments were criticized by some in attendance.

Tomašević was elected to the DSS presidency in January 2014. He appeared in the thirty-fourth position on the party's list in the 2014 Serbian parliamentary election, in which the party fell below the electoral threshold for assembly representation. In October 2014, he was re-elected to the party presidency.

Tomašević introduced a new coat of arms for Prijepolje in April 2016, noting that it recognized "all the most important elements from the history, tradition and culture of Prijepolje and the peoples who live in this area today, both Serbs and Bosniaks."

The DSS contested the 2016 local elections in Prijepolje in an alliance with the SRS and Together for Serbia (ZZS). Tomašević led the list and was re-elected when it won three seats; he was the only DSS member elected to the new assembly, as the other two seats were won by SRS members. The SNS formed a new coalition government after the election; the DSS served in opposition, and Tomašević's term as speaker came to an end.

=== Departure from the DSS ===
In July 2017, Tomašević urged the DSS's new leader, Miloš Jovanović, to break off planned talks with Serbian president Aleksandar Vučić concerning Kosovo and Metohija, on the grounds that it would give legitimacy to Vučić's "treacherous" Kosovo policy. The following month, Tomašević was expelled from the DSS.

Tomašević later said that he had not been advised by the party of any disciplinary proceedings against him, nor had he been able to raise a defence. He contended that he had been expelled from the party for repeatedly expressing his opinion that "the DSS [should] end collaboration and any form of cooperation with the dictatorial regime of A. Vučić and use all available legal means to fight for its overthrow, just as it once did against Milošević." He added that he had no desire to be a part of the self-styled "new DSS" under Jovanović's leadership.

Tomašević continued to serve in the Prijepolje assembly as an independent representative until 2020. He was not a candidate in that year's local elections.

== Electoral record ==
=== Local (Prijepolje) ===
2004 Prijepolje municipal election: Mayor of Prijepolje
Candidate	Party	First round		Second round	
Candidate	Party	Votes	%	Votes	%
Mr. Nedžad Turković	Sandžak Democratic Party–Rasim Ljajić	3,148	19.68	7,396	70.72
Aziz Hadžifejzović	"List for Sandžak Dr. Sulejman Ugljanin" (Affiliation: Party of Democratic Action of Sandžak)	2,816	17.61	3,062	29.28
Branko Ćubić Ćuba	Serbian Radical Party–Tomislav Nikolić	2,634	16.47		
Vukosav Tomašević	Democratic Party of Serbia–Vojislav Koštunica	2,597	16.24		
Slobodan Gojković	Democratic Party–Boris Tadić	1,096	6.85		
Budimir Tešević Bude	Social Democracy	968	6.05		
Milan Gačević	New Serbia–Velimir Ilić	802	5.01		
Dragomir Malešić	Citizens' Group: For Prijepolje	557	3.48		
Dragan Ćosović	Socialist Party of Serbia	550	3.44		
Prof. Dr. Milan Martinović Mišo	Social Democratic Party	307	1.92		
Veka Radonjić	Strength of Serbia Movement–Bogoljub Karić	225	1.41		
Nebojša Žunić	Serbian Renewal Movement	185	1.16		
Slobodan Martinović	G17 Plus–Miroljub Labus	110	0.69		
Total		15,995	100.00	10,458	100.00
Valid votes		15,995	98.62	10,458	97.56
Invalid/blank votes		223	1.38	262	2.44
Total votes		16,218	100.00	10,720	100.00
Registered voters/turnout		33,894	47.85	33,895	31.63
