= Drmanovina =

Mountain in Serbia

- Location within Serbia

Highest point
- Elevation: 1,022 m (3,353 ft)
- Coordinates: 43°58′50″N 19°50′00″E

Geography
- Location: Western Serbia
- Parent range: Dinaric Alps

Drmanovina (Serbian Cyrillic: Дрмановина) is a mountain in western Serbia, near the town of Kosjerić. Its highest peak Grad has an elevation of 1,022 m (3,353 ft) above sea level.

== See also ==
- List of mountains in Serbia
