= Stojići, Kosjerić =

Stojići Стојићи
- Village
- Location within Serbia
- Coordinates: 44°04′07″N 19°53′28″E
- Country: Serbia
- District: Zlatibor District
- Municipality: Kosjerić

Population (2011)
  - Total: 105
- Time zone: UTC+1 (CET)
  - Summer (DST): UTC+2 (CEST)

Stojići (Serbian Cyrillic: Стојићи) is a village in the municipality of Kosjerić in western Serbia. According to the 2011 census, the village has a population of 105 inhabitants.
