= Varda, Kosjerić =

Varda Варда
- Village
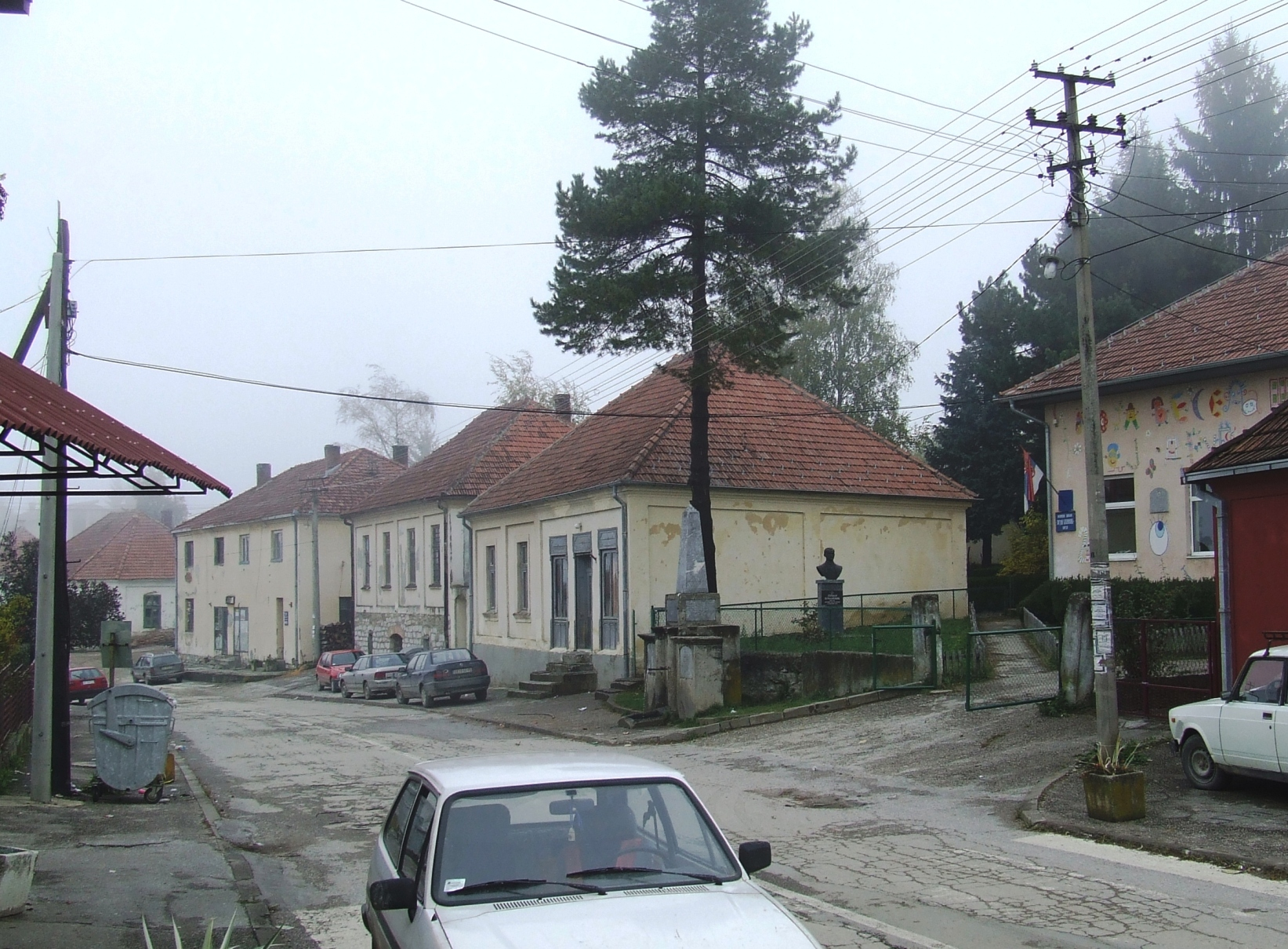

- Location within Serbia
- Coordinates: 44.045°N 19.75°E
- Country: Serbia
- District: Zlatibor District
- Municipality: Kosjerić

Population (2011)
  - Total: 230
- Time zone: UTC+1 (CET)
  - Summer (DST): UTC+2 (CEST)

Varda (Serbian Cyrillic: Варда) is a village in the municipality of Kosjerić in western Serbia. According to the 2011 census, the village has a population of 230 inhabitants.
