= Lužnica, Visoko =

Lužnica
- Village
- Location within Bosnia and Herzegovina
- Coordinates: 44.0569237°N 18.1942876°E
- Country: Bosnia and Herzegovina
- Entity: Federation of Bosnia and Herzegovina
- Canton: Zenica-Doboj
- Municipality: Visoko

Area
  - Total: 2.50 sq mi (6.48 km^{2})

Population (2013)
  - Total: 21
  - Density: 8.4/sq mi (3.2/km^{2})
- Time zone: UTC+1 (CET)
  - Summer (DST): UTC+2 (CEST)

Lužnica is a village in the municipality of Visoko, Bosnia and Herzegovina.

== Demographics ==
According to the 2013 census, its population was 21.

Ethnicity in 2013
Ethnicity	Number	Percentage
Bosniaks	19	90.5%
Serbs	2	9.5%
Total	21	100%
