= Skrapež (river) =

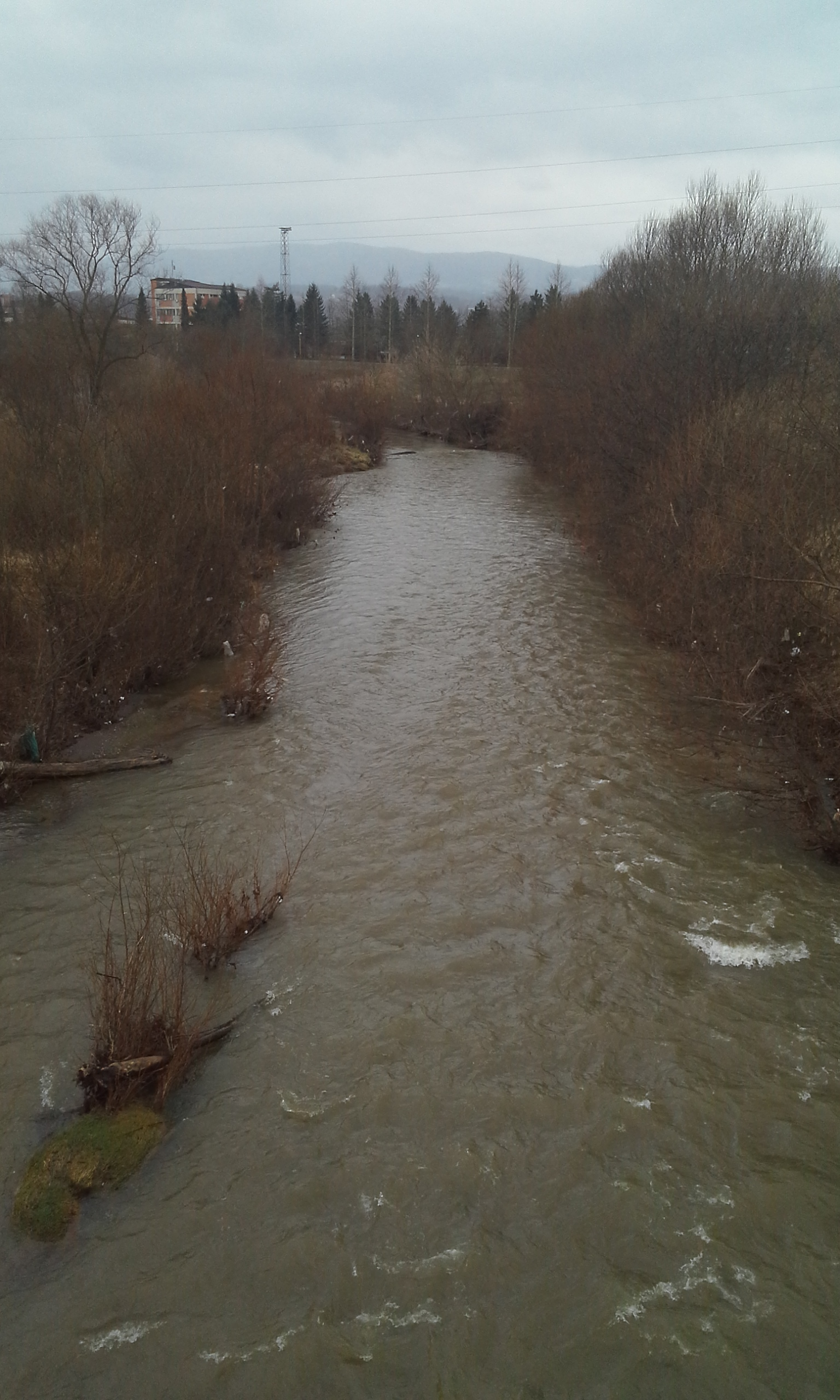
- River Skrapež in Požega, March 2017

Location
- Country: Serbia
- Municipalities: Kosjerić, Valjevo, Požega

Physical characteristics
- Source
  - location: Povlen, Kosjerić, Zlatibor
- Mouth
  - location: Đetinja, near Požega, Zlatibor
  - coordinates: 43°50′29″N 20°04′01″E
  - elevation: 300 m (980 ft)
- Length: 47.7 km (29.6 mi)
- Basin size: 630 km^{2} (240 sq mi)

Basin features
- Progression: Đetinja→ West Morava→ Great Morava→ Danube→ Black Sea
- Tributaries
  - left: Kladoroba, Gradnja, Dobrinja River
  - right: Lužnica

Skrapež (Serbian Cyrillic: Скрапеж; pronounced [skrâːpeʒ]), is a river in central Serbia. It is 47.7 kilometres (29.6 mi) long and it flows into Đetinja river, which some 1.5 kilometres (0.93 mi) later creates West Morava, along with the Golijska Moravica. Skrapež belongs to the Black Sea drainage basin. The river originates on the southeastern slope of Povlen mountain, at the confluence of two smaller rivers: Sečnica and Godljevača.

== Bibliography ==
- "Mala enciklopedija Prosveta: Opšta enciklopedija". Mala enciklopedija Prosveta (3 ed.). Beograd: Prosveta. 1985. ISBN 978-86-07-00001-2.
- Marković, Jovan Đ. (1990). Enciklopedijski geografski leksikon Jugoslavije. Sarajevo: Svjetlost. ISBN 978-86-01-02651-3.
