= Kosjerić =

Kosjeríć Косјерић (Serbian)
- Town and municipality
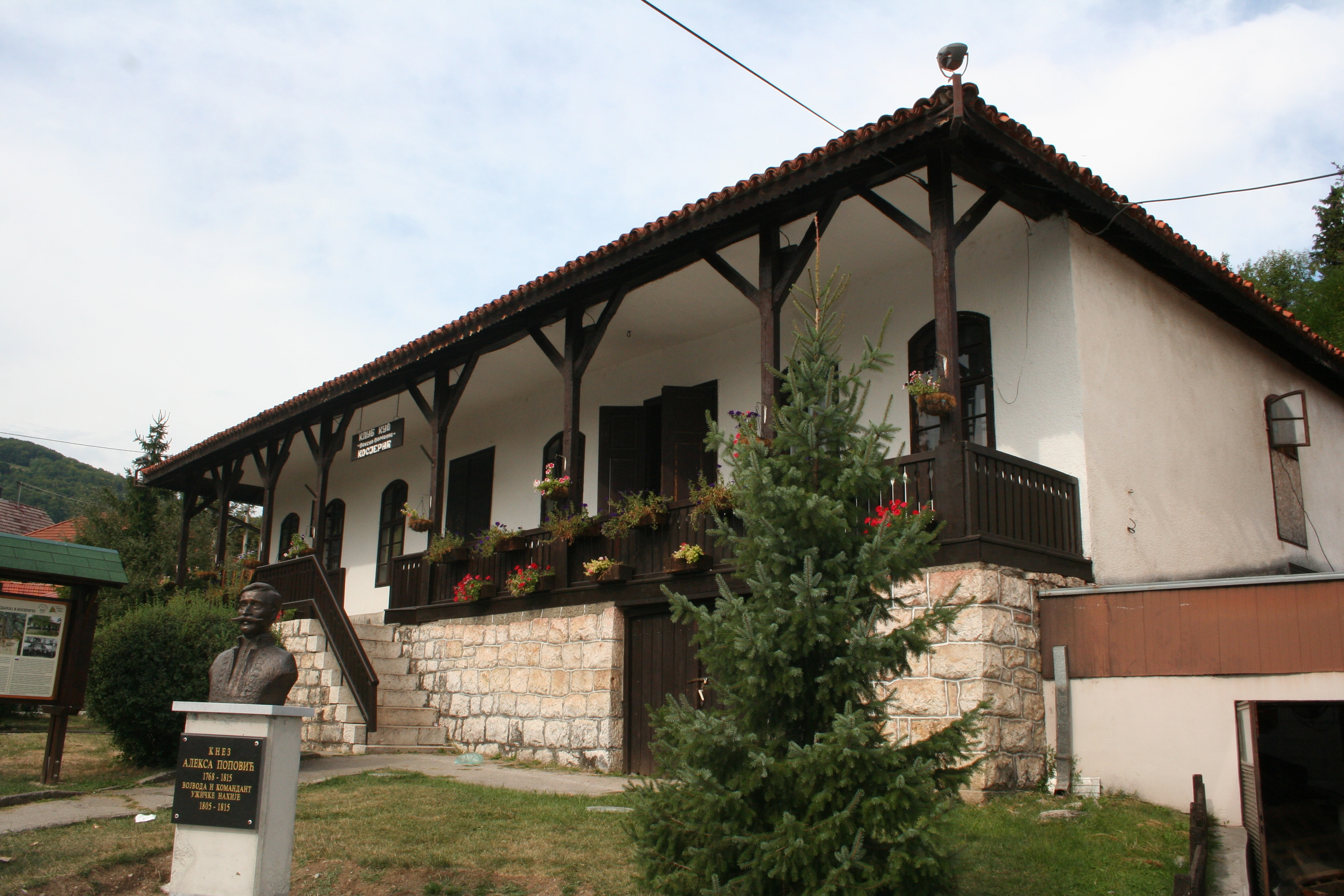

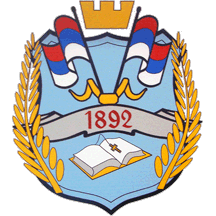
- Coat of arms

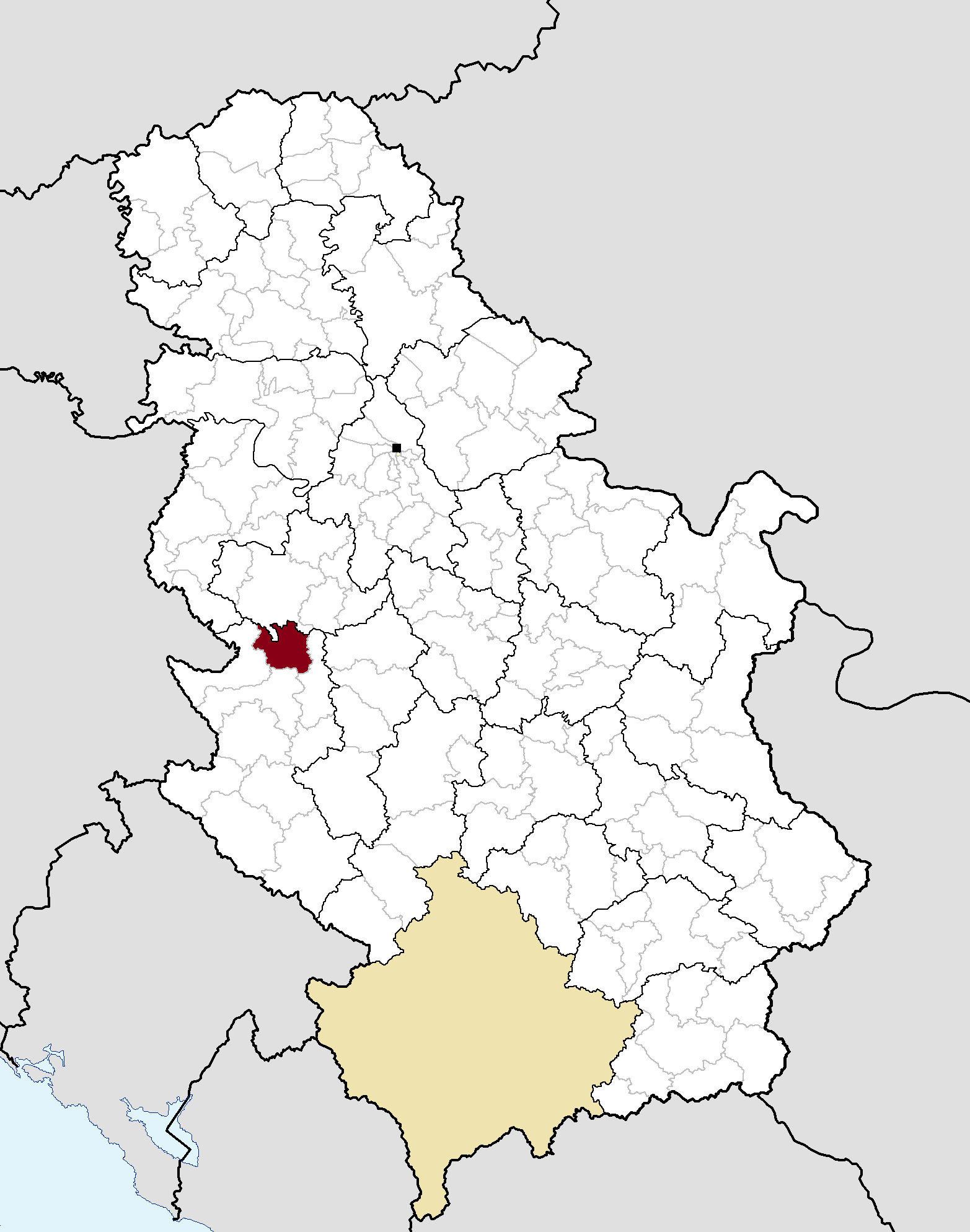
- Location of the municipality of Kosjerić within Serbia
- Coordinates: 44°00′N 19°55′E
- Country: Serbia
- Region: Šumadija and Western Serbia
- District: Zlatibor
- Settlements: 27

Government
  - Mayor: Žarko Đokić (SNS)

Area
  - Town: 3.34 km^{2} (1.29 sq mi)
  - Municipality: 358 km^{2} (138 sq mi)
- Elevation: 415 m (1,362 ft)

Population (2022 census)
  - Town: 3,723
  - Town density: 1,110/km^{2} (2,890/sq mi)
  - Municipality: 10,175
  - Municipality density: 28.4/km^{2} (73.6/sq mi)
- Time zone: UTC+1 (CET)
  - Summer (DST): UTC+2 (CEST)
- Postal code: 31260
- Area code: +381(0)31
- Car plates: UE
- Website: www.kosjeric.rs

Kosjeríć (Serbian Cyrillic: Косјерић, pronounced [kɔsjɛ̌rit͡ɕ]) is a town and municipality located in the Zlatibor District of western Serbia. The municipality has a population of 10,175 inhabitants and the town itself has 3,723 (2022 census). The municipality's area is 359 square kilometres (139 sq mi), with 26 villages mostly placed in the river valleys, though there are also some settlements in the mountains at altitudes of more than 1,000 metres (3,300 feet).

== Geography ==
The town is situated on the road between Požega on one end and Valjevo on the other. The town is near the mountain tourist centres: Divčibare and Zlatibor. It lies at the foothill of Drmanovina and Crnokosa and from south Povlen and Maljen mountains.

=== Climate ===
Kosjerić has a humid continental climate (Köppen climate classification: Dfb), that's very close to an oceanic climate (Köppen climate classification: Cfb).

Climate data for Kosjerić
Month	Jan	Feb	Mar	Apr	May	Jun	Jul	Aug	Sep	Oct	Nov	Dec	Year
Mean daily maximum °C (°F)	3.1 (37.6)	6.0 (42.8)	11.4 (52.5)	15.1 (59.2)	19.9 (67.8)	23.4 (74.1)	25.5 (77.9)	25.8 (78.4)	22.3 (72.1)	16.9 (62.4)	9.4 (48.9)	4.9 (40.8)	15.3 (59.5)
Daily mean °C (°F)	−0.5 (31.1)	2.0 (35.6)	6.3 (43.3)	9.8 (49.6)	14.5 (58.1)	17.9 (64.2)	19.7 (67.5)	19.8 (67.6)	16.4 (61.5)	11.6 (52.9)	5.5 (41.9)	1.6 (34.9)	10.4 (50.7)
Mean daily minimum °C (°F)	−4.0 (24.8)	−1.9 (28.6)	1.2 (34.2)	4.6 (40.3)	9.2 (48.6)	12.5 (54.5)	14.0 (57.2)	13.8 (56.8)	10.5 (50.9)	6.4 (43.5)	1.7 (35.1)	−1.7 (28.9)	5.5 (41.9)
Average precipitation mm (inches)	62 (2.4)	57 (2.2)	57 (2.2)	68 (2.7)	90 (3.5)	92 (3.6)	81 (3.2)	65 (2.6)	67 (2.6)	65 (2.6)	78 (3.1)	76 (3.0)	858 (33.7)
Source: Climate-Data.org

== History ==
The exact date of the town's founding is unclear. Near the town archaeologists have found Roman and Serbian medieval relics, but it is believed that mass immigration occurred before the Serbian Revolution at the beginning of the nineteenth century with people from Montenegro, East Bosnia and the Western Serbian mountains Zlatibor and Tara.

This part of Serbia was under the rule of the Nemanjić dynasty until the Ottoman Empire seized control of the country in 1463. During the next two centuries roads were built and major development began linking the Adriatic Sea to western Serbia and to the east. Wars between Austria-Hungary and the Turks took a toll on the population numbers in Kosjerić.

It is thought that the oldest inhabitants of the town were from the family Kosijer. From legends it is said that Antonije Kosjer came in Kosijer from Montenegro and brought his three sons along with him. After that Jovan Baronim came from the village Bare and his sister accompanied him with seven sons. It is recorded that there was migration from the village of Divci and from Montenegrin Kolašin.

Rapid development began in 1882, but it was suppressed by the faster-growing communities of nearby bigger towns, Valjevo and Požega. Kosjerić reached the status of the town in 1966 and economic development after the completion of the Belgrade-Bar railway in the 1970s.

== Demographics ==
Historical population
Year	Pop.	±% p.a.
1948	17,917	—
1953	18,592	+0.74%
1961	17,898	−0.47%
1971	16,582	−0.76%
1981	16,157	−0.26%
1991	15,478	−0.43%
2002	14,001	−0.91%
2011	12,090	−1.62%
2022	10,175	−1.56%

According to the 2011 census results, the municipality of Kosjerić has a population of 12,090 inhabitants.

=== Ethnic groups ===
Ethnic composition of the municipality:

Ethnic group	Population	%
Serbs	11,879	98.25%
Montenegrins	23	0.19%
Croats	8	0.07%
Others	180	1.49%
Total	12,090	

== Settlements ==
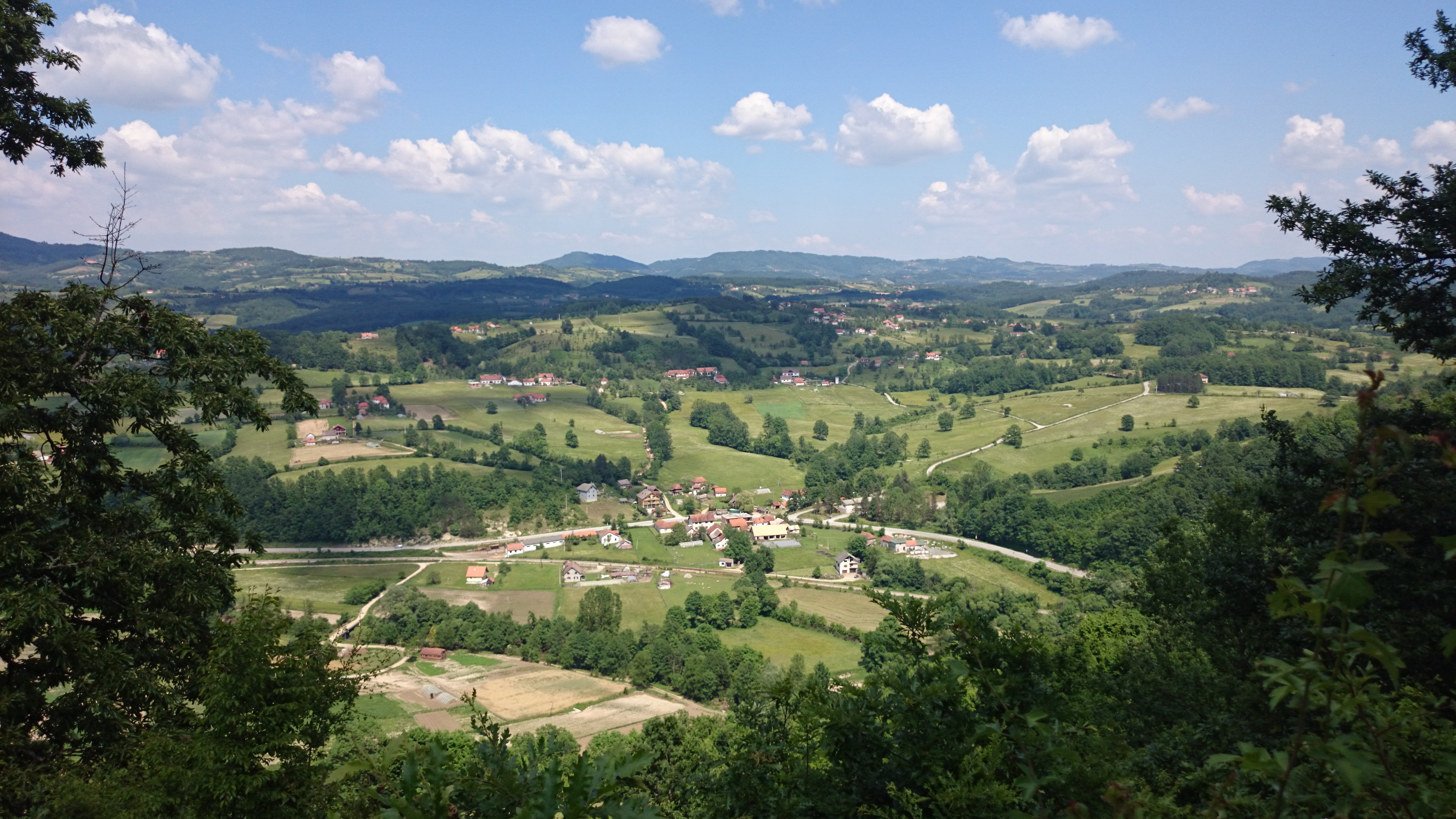
Landscape in Tubići village

Aside from the town of Kosjerić, the municipality includes the following 27 settlements:

- Bjeloperica
- Brajkovići
- Varda
- Galovići
- Godečevo
- Godljevo
- Gornja Pološnica
- Donja Pološnica
- Drenovci
- Dubnica
- Makovište
- Mionica
- Mrčići
- Mušići
- Paramun
- Radanovci
- Rosići
- Ruda Bukva
- Seča Reka
- Skakavci
- Stojići
- Subjel
- Tubići
- Cikote
- Ševrljuge

== Economy ==
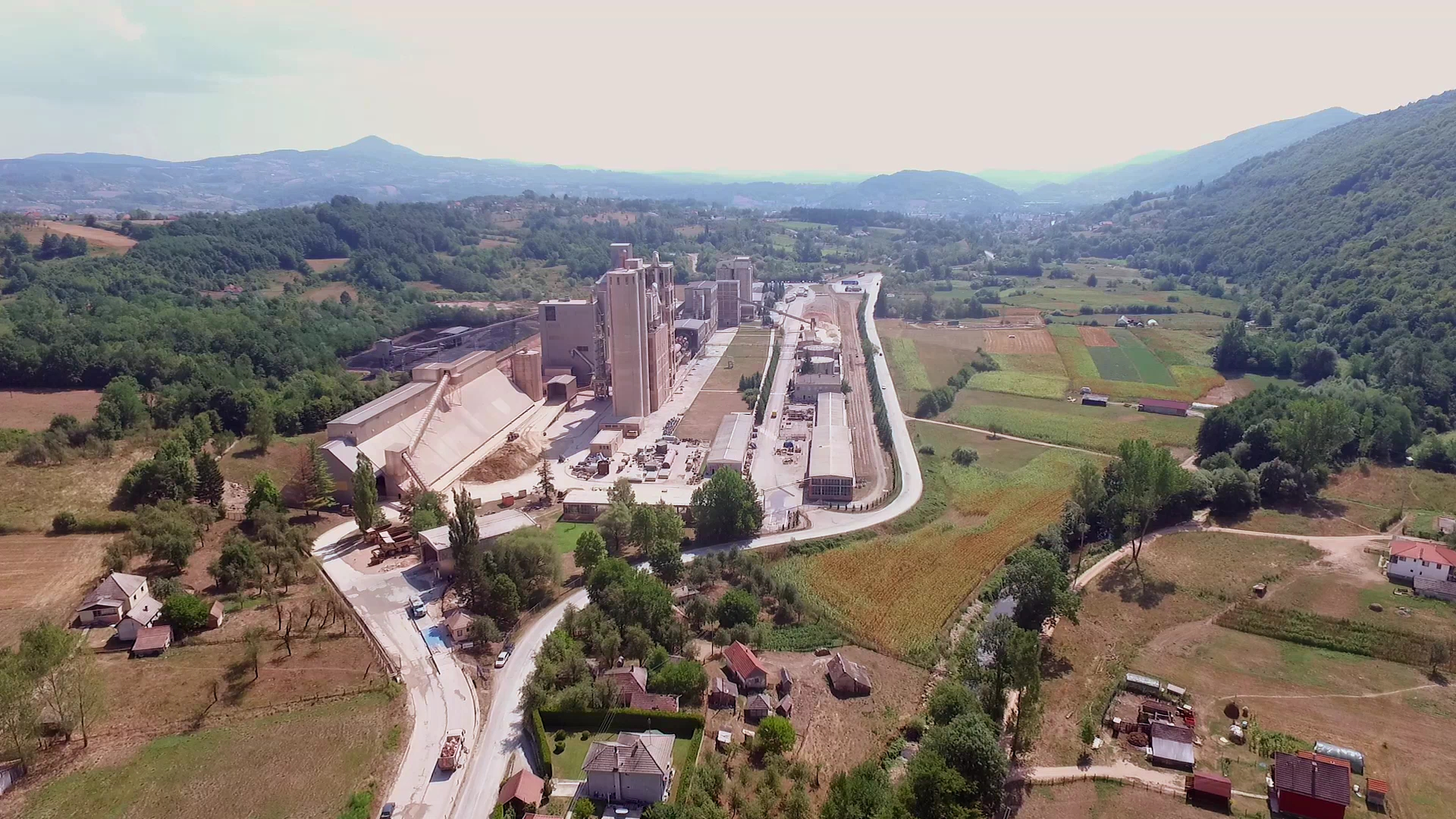
The cement factory in 2018

Much of Kosjeríć's economy is based on agriculture and processing industry, with local cement factory being the key of economic development in past few decades. The cement factory is one of three Serbian cement factories and it has helped boost the economic prosperity not only for the town but for the whole region. In 2002, TITAN Group and the Serbian Privatization Agency signed an agreement for the transfer of 70% of the share capital of the Kosjerić Cement company, a deal worth $35.5 million. As of 2013, the production capacity of the Kosjerić cement plant was 750,000 tons. With modernization of production processes, the number of employees fell from 680 in 2002 to around 250 in 2013. Many of the town citizens are employed at the factory.

Due to its location and climate Kosjerić has a strong production of fruit and vegetables, most of which are plums and raspberries. The area is well known for its plum brandy (40–45% ABV; "ljuta rakija"). Other successful companies are: concrete pipelines manufacturer "Pim-Grad", electric equipment manufacturer "Elkok" and factories for the manufacture of concrete elements like "Kofeniks" and "Povlen".

The following table gives a preview of total number of registered people employed in legal entities per their core activity (as of 2018):

Activity	Total
Agriculture, forestry and fishing	25
Mining and quarrying	2
Manufacturing	1,033
Electricity, gas, steam and air conditioning supply	34
Water supply; sewerage, waste management and remediation activities	41
Construction	114
Wholesale and retail trade, repair of motor vehicles and motorcycles	336
Transportation and storage	260
Accommodation and food services	98
Information and communication	20
Financial and insurance activities	11
Real estate activities	1
Professional, scientific and technical activities	83
Administrative and support service activities	25
Public administration and defense; compulsory social security	118
Education	182
Human health and social work activities	83
Arts, entertainment and recreation	21
Other service activities	37
Individual agricultural workers	343
Total	2,866

== Tourism ==
Kosjerić has developing tourism industry. Kosjerić and the surrounding area are known for their fresh air and beautiful nature. High mountains, fields, wood and water wells surround the town and it is famous for country tourism and the production of healthy food. Fresh air and nice climate are very appropriate for different sports; hence Kosjerić became a famous sport center equipped with different types of sport fields on 40,000 square metres (430,000 square feet), sports hall with 700 stands, Olympic-sized pool and several football, basketball and handball playgrounds.

Kosjerić has attracted many people from central Serbia for its famed festivals: "The Shepard Days" (Serbian: Čobanski dani), which is held every July, and "Days of Petar Lazić" (Serbian: Dani Petra Lazića), which was established as an annual event in August 2018 in honor of the Kosjerić-born author Petar Lazić (1960–2017). Also, every year an NGO called "K-Town Group" organizes an international art camp "Kosjerić", which includes different art workshops with 50 participants from around the world. The development and reconstruction of the "Hotel Olympic" has also further helped increase tourist numbers.

== Gallery ==
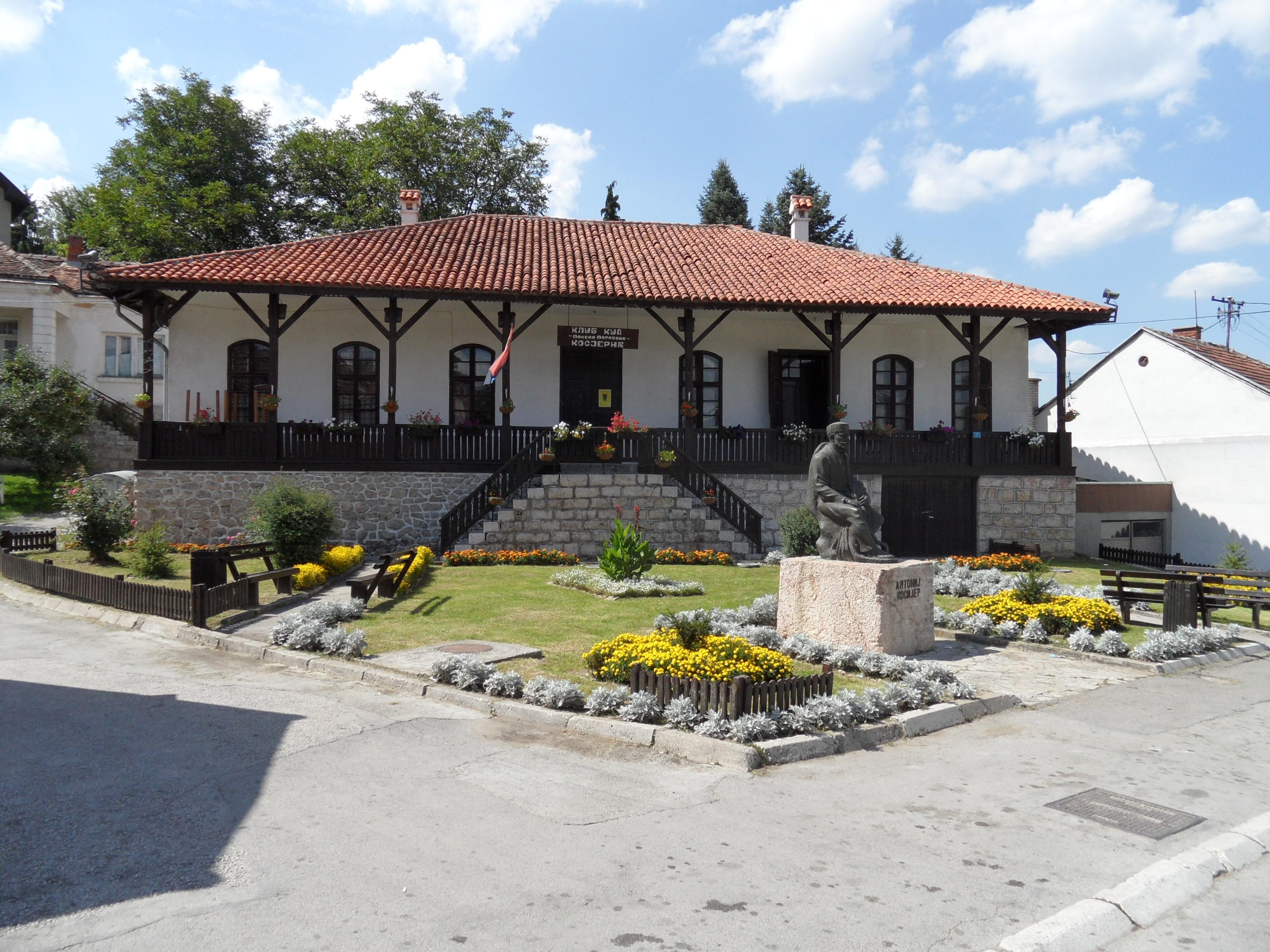
Stari han

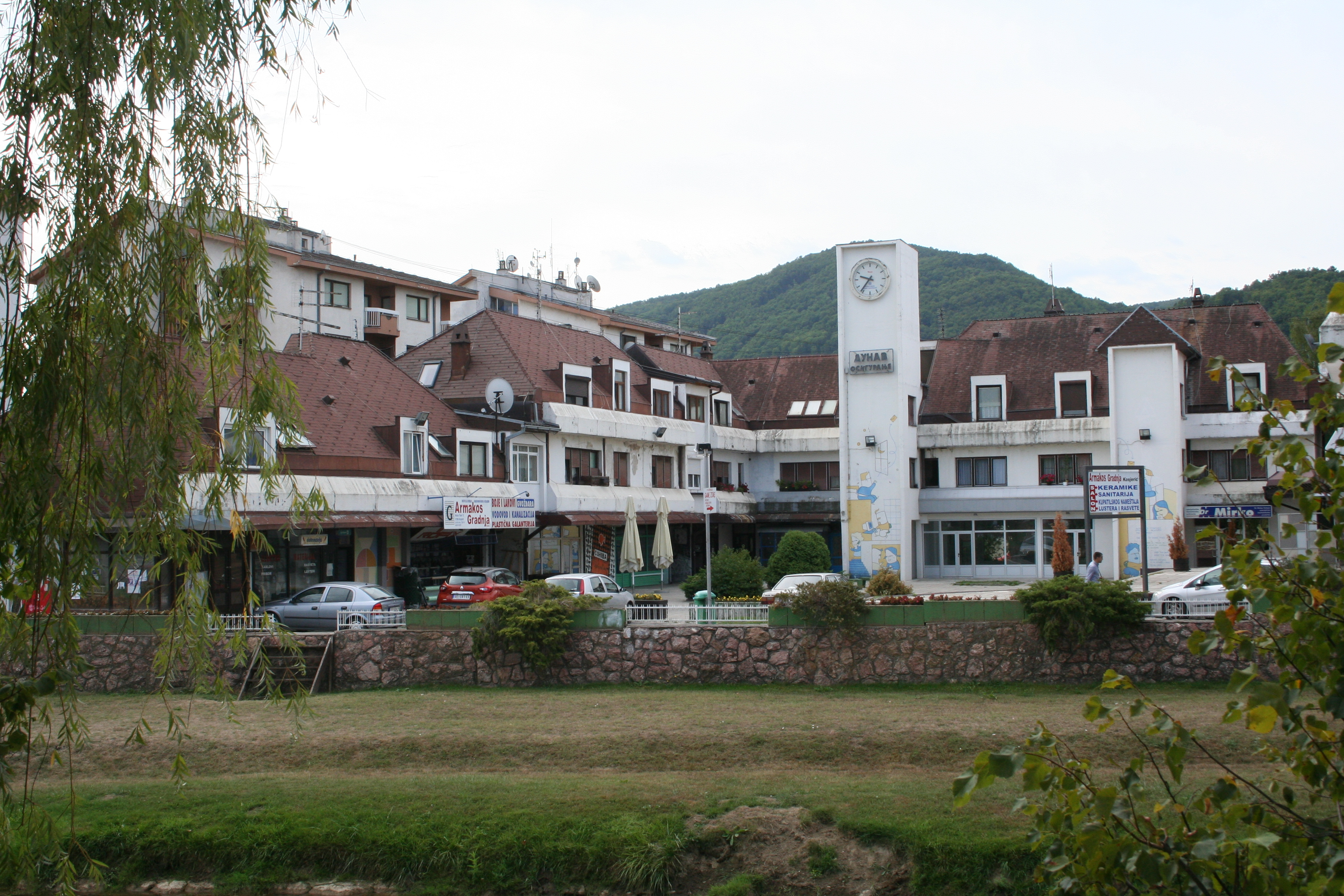
Kosjerić town center

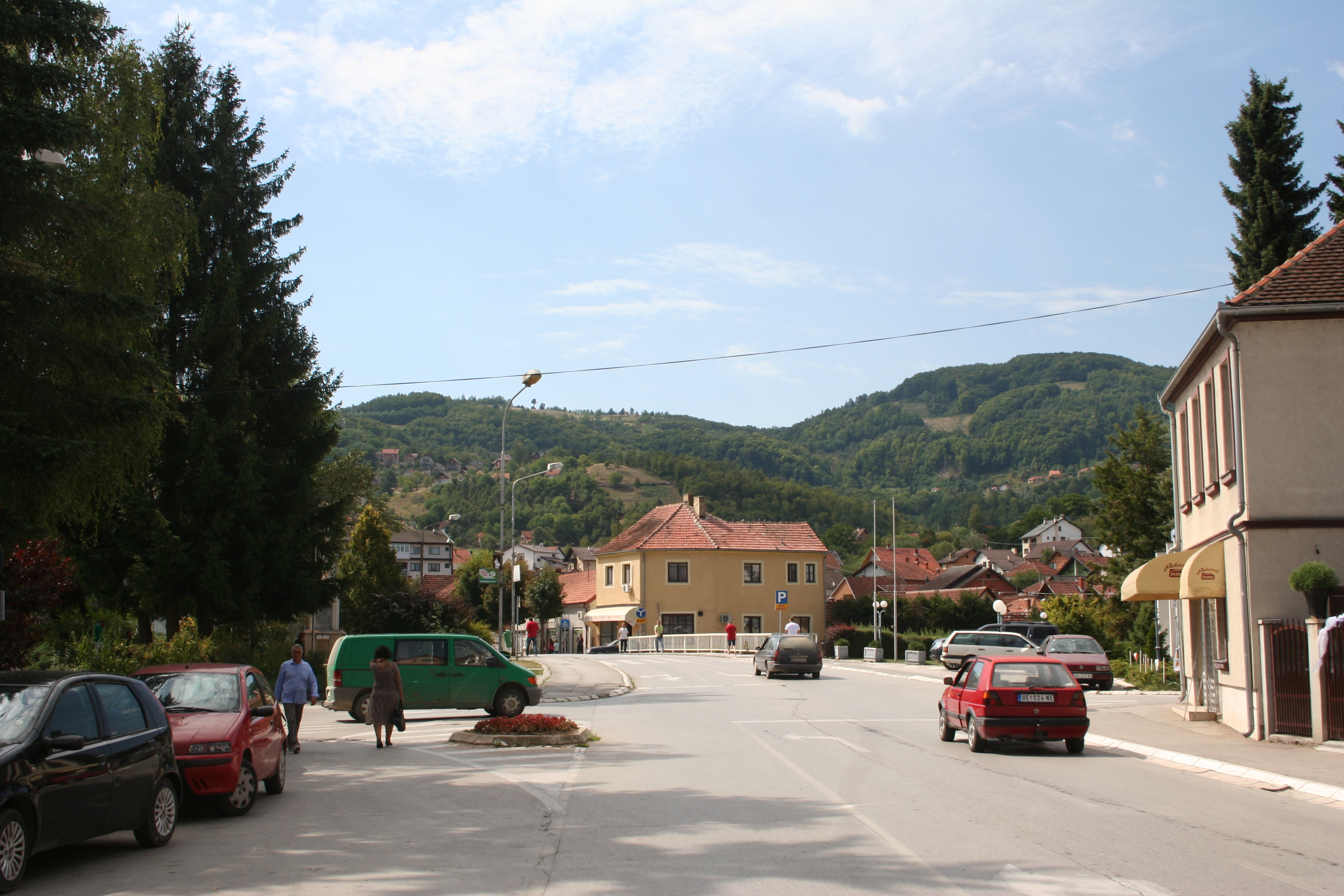
Kosjerić town center

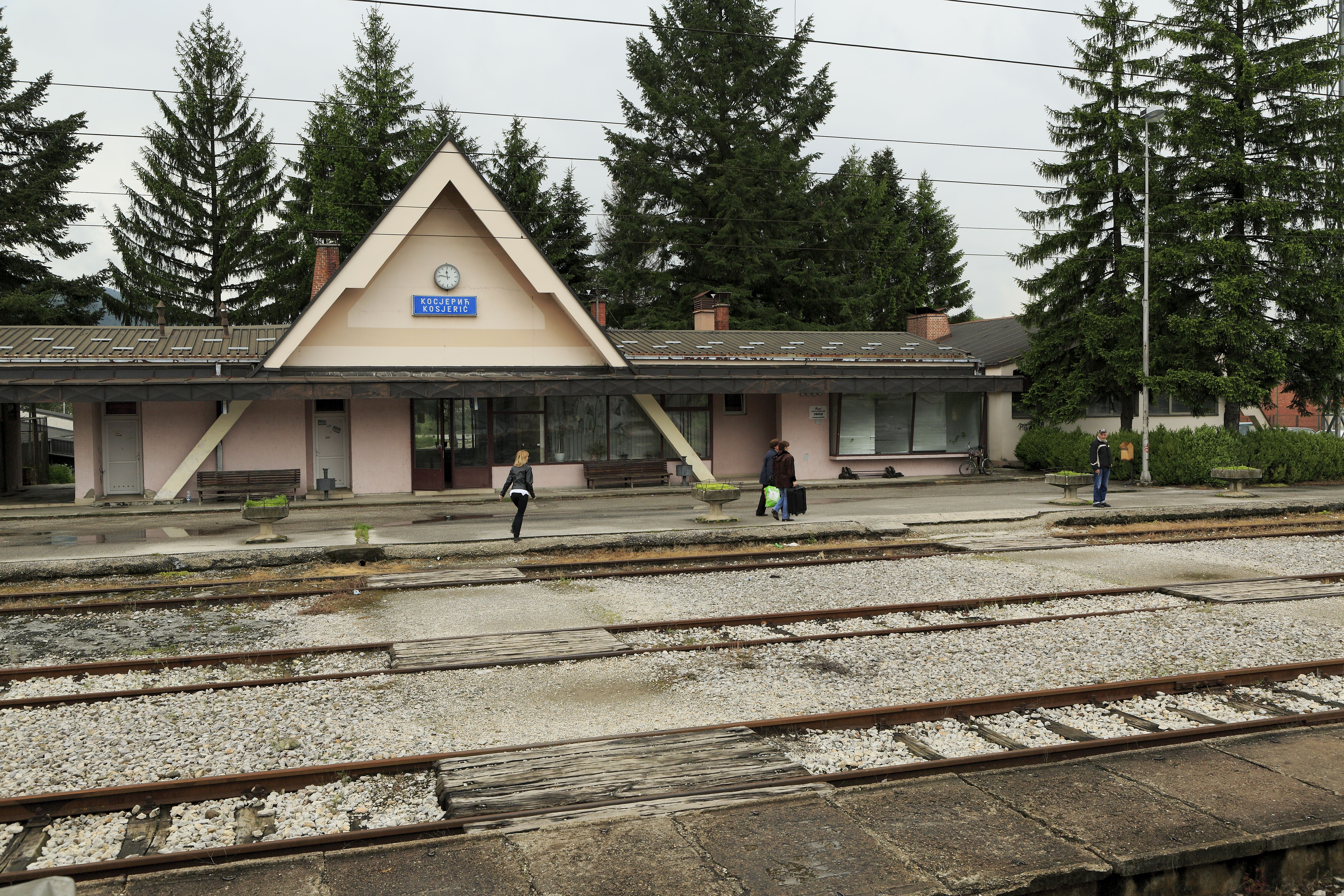
Kosjerić Train Station

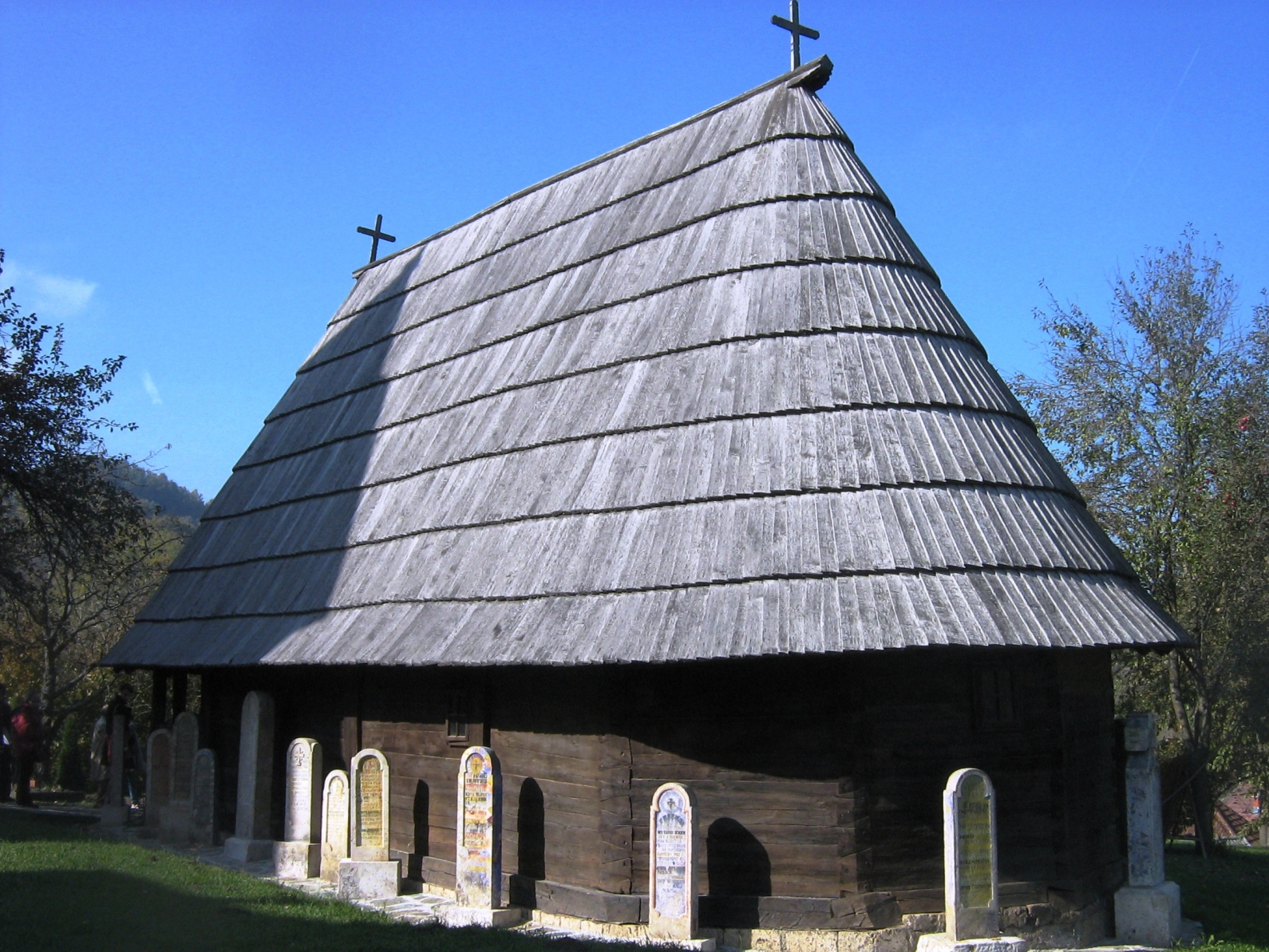
Seča Reka wooden church

== Twin cities ==
- Slovenske Konjice, Slovenia

== See also ==
- List of populated places in Serbia
