= Methodius, Metropolitan of Belgrade =

Metropolitan of Belgrade

Methodius
- Metropolitan of Belgrade
- Church: Ecumenical Patriarchate
- Province: Sanjak of Smederevo
- Metropolis: Metropolitanate of Belgrade
- Installed: September 1791
- Term ended: 26 January 1801
- Predecessor: Dionysius
- Successor: Leontius

Orders
- Rank: Metropolitan

Personal details
- Born: Ottoman Empire
- Died: 26 January 1801 Belgrade, Ottoman Empire
- Denomination: Eastern Orthodox
- Residence: Belgrade (1791–1801)

Methodius (Serbian: Metodije) was the Metropolitan of Belgrade from 1791 to 1801. He served during the return of Ottoman rule to central Serbia following the Austro-Turkish War (1788–91).

Metropolitan of Belgrade Dionysius fled to Austria at the end of the Austro-Turkish War, prior to the fall of Belgrade (Treaty of Sistova). The Ecumenical Patriarchate ordained Methodius his successor in September 1791, when the Ottomans returned their sovereignty to northern Serbia. Methodius was described as cleverful in church and political matters, and was obliged by the Patriarchate of Constantinople to cooperate with Hadji Mustafa Pasha, the Vizier of Belgrade. Apart from the Metropolitanate of Belgrade, he was given to manage almost all of the Eparchy of Vidin (which territory was under the governorship of Mustafa Pasha). Methodius was murdered on 26 January 1801, allegedly on Mustafa Pasha's orders. Archimandrite Hadži-Ruvim however claimed that he was drowned "due to his lawlessness and wrongdoings", having been a tyrant. Serbian historian Milenko Vukićević, most likely based on Lazar Batalaka (who did not cite a source), described him as a good-hearted elder, killed after his disciple Leontius falsely accused him of guilt to Mustafa Pasha. It was later proved that the Dahije (renegade Janissaries) had him killed, as was done with Mustafa Pasha soon afterwards. He was succeeded by Leontius, his disciple.

== Sources ==
- Đorđević, M.; Nedeljković, S. (2015). "Политичке прилике у београдском пашалуку у предвечерје српске револуције (1787-1804)". Teme-Časopis za Društvene Nauke: 965–979.
- Radosavljević, Nedeljko V. (2007). Православна црква у Београдском пашалуку 1766-1831: управа Васељенске патријаршије [The Orthodox Church in Belgrade Pashaluk 1766-1831: The Administration of the Universal Patriarchy]. Istorijski institut. ISBN 978-86-7743-065-8.
- Radosavljević, Nedeljko V. (2009). Шест портрета православних митрополита 1766-1891 [Portraits of Six Orthodox Mitropolitans 1766-1891]. Istorijski institut. ISBN 978-86-7743-078-8.

Religious titles
Preceded by Dionysius	Metropolitan of Belgrade; 1791–1801	Succeeded by Leontius
