= Mihailo Pejić =

Prota Mihailo Pejić
- Born: Mihailo Pejić; 1750; Vranić, Sanjak of Smederevo (now Serbia)
- Died: 5 June 1812 (aged 61–62); Zemun, Austrian Empire (now Serbia)
- Other names: Irižanin
- Occupation: Priest
- Religion: Eastern Orthodoxy
- Church: Metropolitanate of Karlovci
- Offices held: archpriest (prota) in Zemun

Mihailo Pejić (Serbian: Михаило Пејић; 1750–1812), known by the demonym Irižanin (Ирижанин, "from Irig"), was a Serbian Orthodox archpriest (prota) in Semlin (Zemun), a city in the Habsburg monarchy. His correspondence with the Serbian rebels of the First Serbian Uprising, the Metropolitan of Karlovci Stefan Stratimirović, and Belgrade Metropolitan Leontius have been preserved and are among important sources in the historiography on the Serbian Revolution.

Pejić was born in Vranić outside Belgrade, in c. 1750. He became a parish priest in Irig in 1778, where he stayed until August 1795. He was mentioned as "deputy" (namjestnik) in 1793. With the outbreak of plague in 1795, he stayed at the Hopovo Monastery until the end of 1796. In 1797 he became the archpriest (prota) in Zemun. One of his predecessors as archpriest in Zemun was David Georgijević (the grandfather of Dimitrije Davidović).

In 1797, Pejić and the other archpriests in Syrmia handed over census data regarding adherents to Metropolitan of Karlovci Stefan Stratimirović (the spiritual leader of Serbs in the Habsburg monarchy). During the uprising against the Dahije, Pejić informed Stratimirović on the events, including the Slaughter of the Knezes. He was a trusted man of Stratimirović and his reports on the uprising became important historiographical sources. Pejić claimed that the murdered archimandrite Hadži-Ruvim had been given up to the Dahije by Belgrade Metropolitan Leontius, although his sources regarding this remain unknown. He informed Stratimirović on the establishment of Serb rebel detachments and the clash at Drlupa and failure of negotiations. He informed Stratimirović on 6 June that Leontius and Antim Zepos were safe in Semlin, waiting to cross back into Serbia. He brought the news of the conquest of Belgrade by the Serbian rebels.

Pejić had a feud with dramatist Joakim Vujić (1772–1847), that began in Zemun in 1809; Vujić was incarcerated for several months and he blamed Pejić who had allegedly accused him of being "a state enemy" of the Austrian monarchy. There were no proof that Pejić was the cause of his arrest.

He died on 5 June 1812 in Zemun. Arsa Teodorović painted his picture in 1804. The correspondence of Pejić and Stratimirović were transferred to the Serbian Royal Academy in 1850–1860.

== See also ==
- Matija Nenadović

== Sources ==
- Perović, Radoslav (1978), "Први српски устанак (акти и писма)", Акти и писма бр. 451, 1, Belgrade: Narodna knjiga
- Radosavljević, Nedeljko V. (2007). Православна црква у Београдском пашалуку 1766-1831. Istorijski institut. ISBN 978-86-7743-065-8.
- Radosavljević, Nedeljko V. (2009). Шест портрета православних митрополита 1766–1891 [Six Portraits of Orthodox Metropolitans 1766–1891]. Istorijski institut. ISBN 978-86-7743-078-8.
- Радовић, Исидора Точанац; Делић, Нино (2024). Карловачка митрополија крајем 18. и почетком 19. века: демографске прилике [The Metropolitanate of Karlovci in the late 18th and early 19th century]. Istorijski institut. ISBN 978-86-7743-156-3.
- Šumarević, Svetislav (1934). Dimitrije Davidović: biografski momenti. Narodna prosveta.
- Stojčić, Isidor (1913). Знаменити земунски Срби у XIX веку. Земун: Штампарија Исидора Стојчића.
