= Petar Nikolajević Moler =

Serbian politician (1775–1816)

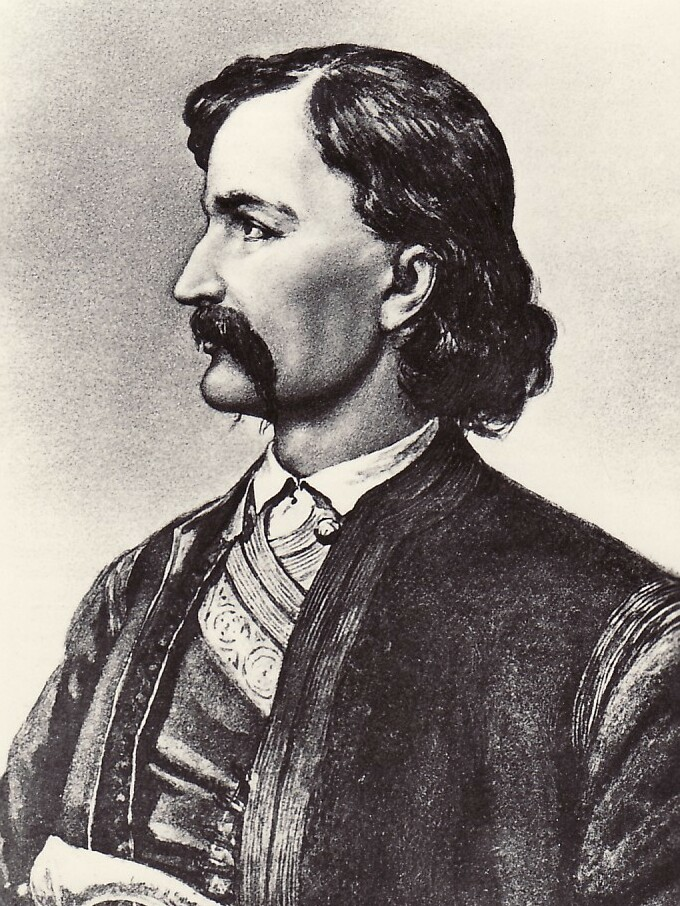

5th Prime Minister of Serbia
- In office 21 November 1815 – 16 May 1816
- Monarch: Miloš
- Preceded by: Karađorđe (1813)
- Succeeded by: Jevrem Obrenović

Personal details
- Born: 1775 Babina Luka, Ottoman Empire
- Died: 1816 (aged 40–41) Bogovađa, Principality of Serbia
- Party: Independent

Petar Nikolajević Moler (1775 – 1816) was a Serbian politician and revolutionary who served as prime minister of Serbia from 1815 to 1816. He participated in both the first and second uprising.

== Biography ==
Petar Nikolajević was born in 1775.

Moler was educated as a painter, known for his works in several monasteries in the pre-Uprising period, and thus earning his nickname, Moler (painter in Serbian). He was the first modern painter in Serbia.

He was a nephew of Hadži-Ruvim, who was executed by the Dahije (renegade Janissaries) during the Slaughter of the knezes.

In the First Serbian Uprising, Moler distinguished himself in battle near the village of Jelenča. During the uprising, he painted the church built by Karađorđe in Topola. During the defense of Loznica in 1813, because of a lack of ink, Moler wrote a letter with his blood to the leaders of the uprising. After the failure of the uprising, Moler fled to the Austrian Empire, but returned to Serbia at the start of the Second Serbian Uprising.

He was President of the Serbian Government from 1815 to 1816. Moler and Bishop Melentije Simeonović Nikšić were among the first opposition leaders to Prince Miloš Obrenović, and as such were killed in 1816.

== See also ==
- List of prime ministers of Serbia
- List of Serbian Revolutionaries

== Sources ==
- Radovan M. Drašković (1967). Petar Nikolajević Moler. b.i.
- Velibor Savić (2006). Vojvoda Petar Nikolajević Moler. Samostalno izdanje autora. ISBN 978-86-903169-4-6.

Government offices
Preceded by Karađorđe	Prime Minister of Serbia; 1815–1816	Succeeded by Jevrem Obrenović
