= Bogovađa Monastery =

Monastery in Serbia

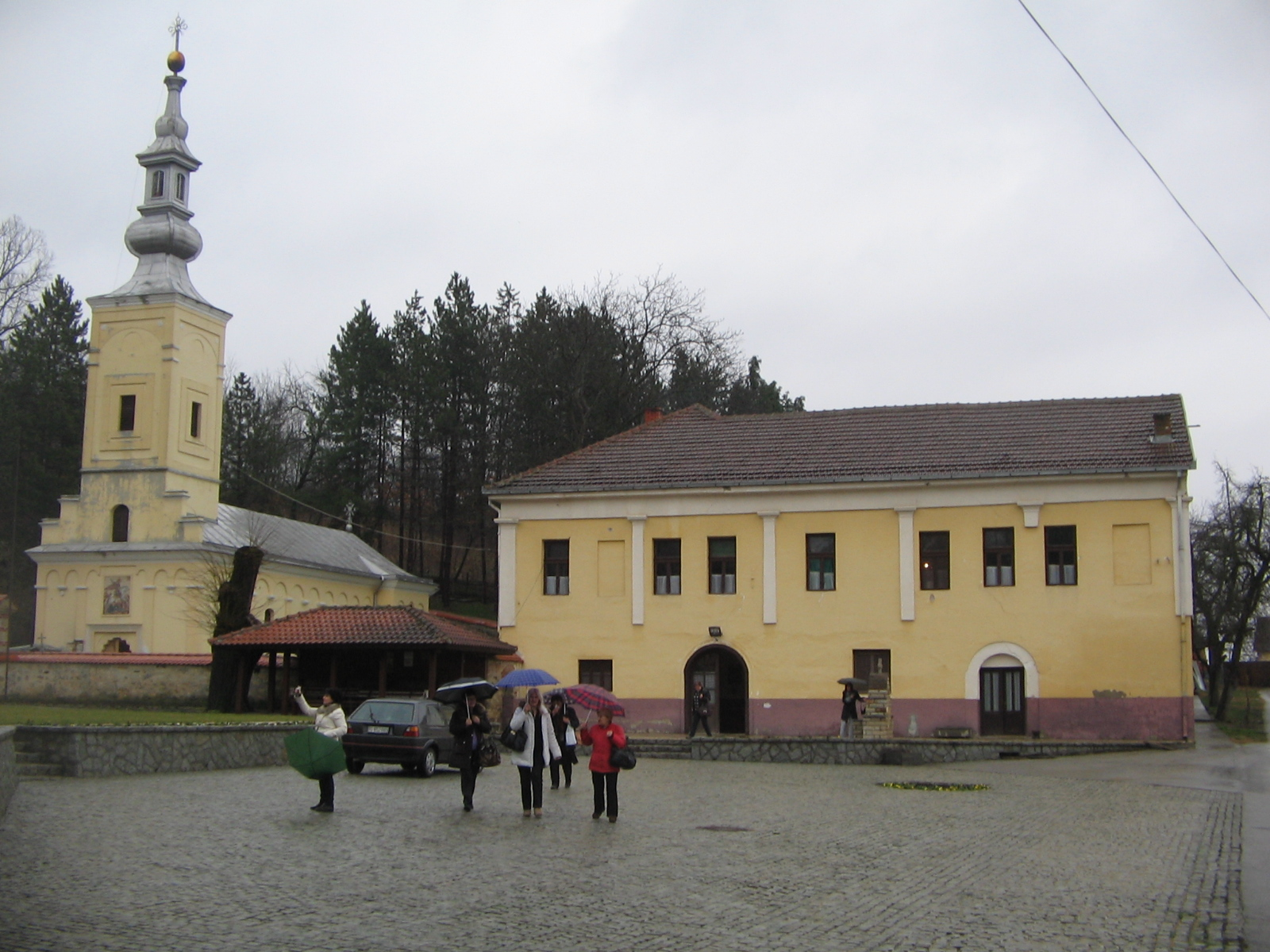
- Interactive map of Bogovađa Monastery

Monastery information
- Order: Serbian Orthodox
- Established: 15th century

People
- Important associated figures: Hadži-Ruvim

Site
- Location: Bogovađa, Lajkovac, Serbia
- Coordinates: 44.3208°N 20.1827°E
- Public access: Yes

Bogovađa Monastery (Serbian Cyrillic: Манастир Боговађа) is a Serbian Orthodox monastery located in Bogovađa near Lajkovac in central Serbia. The monastery has been a bastion of learning since its inception. It had been renovated several times in history, the original monastery dating back to the 15th century, founded by Serbian Despot Stefan Lazarević (r. 1402–1427). Hieromonk Mardarije erected a new monastery, dedicated to St. George, at the location of the ruins, in 1545. It was destroyed in the 18th century, then reconstructed by clergymen Hadži-Ruvim, Vasilije Petrović and Hadži-Ðera between 1791 and 1795. It was renovated in 1806 by Avakum, and Prince Miloš Obrenović in 1816. The present church facade dates to 1852, while the iconostasis was finished by 1858 by Milija Marković and his sons from Požarevac. Hieromonk Mardarije and prince Grgur Branković were buried in the monastery. The churchyard includes tombs of soldiers over two centuries, and a fountain built in 1796. The locals called the fountain Bogova voda ("God's water"), hence the name of the monastery.

== See also ==
- List of Serbian Orthodox monasteries
