= Metropolitan Leontius =

Metropolitan Leontius (Greek: Λεόντιος, Serbian: Леонтије, Russian: Леонид) may refer to:

- Leontius, Metropolitan of Belgrade
- Leontius (Turkevich) (1876–1965), Metropolitan of the North American Diocese of the Russian Orthodox Church 1950–1965
