= Slaughter of the Knezes =

Dahije mass assassinations of Knyaz; post-event outrage causes Serbs to revolt

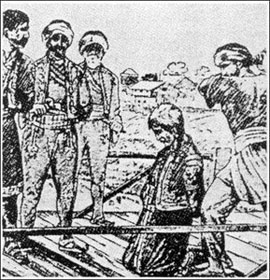
- Dahije beheading a Serb knez.
- Location: Sanjak of Smederevo (now Central Serbia)
- Date: January–10 February 1804
- Target: Notable Serbs
- Attack type: Murders and assaults
- Deaths: 95–150
- Perpetrator: Dahije (renegade Janissaries)

The Slaughter of the Knezes (Serbian: Сеча кнезова, romanized: Seča knezova) was a campaign of organized murders and assaults of notable Serbs in the Belgrade Pashalik (Sanjak of Smederevo) in January–February 1804 by the renegade Janissaries known as "Dahije", who had seized power in a coup against the Vizier Hadji Mustafa Pasha in 1800–1801. Fearing Serbian plans of rebellion, they decided to execute leading Serbs throughout the pashalik. At least 95 notable Serbs were murdered, many of whose decapitated heads were put on public display. Among the notable victims were Aleksa Nenadović, Ilija Birčanin, Hadži-Ruvim. The event triggered the First Serbian Uprising, aimed at putting an end to the centuries of Ottoman occupation.

== Background ==
Following the Austro-Turkish War (1788–91), the Porte gave amnesty to participants on the Austrian side (including the Serbs) and banned the problematic Janissaries from the Belgrade Pashalik. The Janissaries had before been part of the backbone of Ottoman military power but had lost their importance in the 18th century, becoming a source of disorder, due to lack of discipline and bad morals. It was clear that military reforms according to European models were needed, thus the Porte decided to banish them. The Janissaries revolted and briefly occupied Belgrade, but they were expelled by the new Vizier Hadji Mustafa Pasha (t. 1793–1801), who is remembered positively in Serbian history, having improved the situation in the Pashalik through reforms. A well-trained Serbian militia supported Mustafa Pasha against the invading Janissaries and Vidin Pasha Osman Pazvantoglu, and as a reward the Pashalik's Serbs received self-governing privileges and better socio-economic status. Violence on Christians was strictly forbidden and measures were taken to distance the rural Muslims and Christians as to not make way for conflict. The Serbian militia continued to defeat Janissary rebels. The significant improvement to the Serbs' status did not last long, as new conflicts with Janissaries arose and external threats made the Porte allow for the return of the Janissaries in early 1799. The reign of Selim III (1789–1806) saw internal conflicts, with tumult among the pashas, ayans and kircalis.

The Janissaries renewed terror against the Serbs, plundering and killing in the interior of the Pashalik, then proceeded to capture Belgrade and Mustafa Pasha in July 1801, murdered him in December, then ruled the Pashalik with a Vizier as their puppet. The Janissaries were led by Aganlija, Kučuk-Alija, Mula-Jusuf and Mehmed-aga Fočić. The Pashalik became a haven for Janissaries and other bandits, coming from Bosnia, Albania and elsewhere in Rumelia. They came into conflict with the Serbs, sipahi (noble cavalry) and ordinary "Turks". The Janissaries, called the Dahije, abolished the Serbs' rights, banished unsupportive sipahi and invited Muslims from nearby sanjaks which they used to control the Serbs.

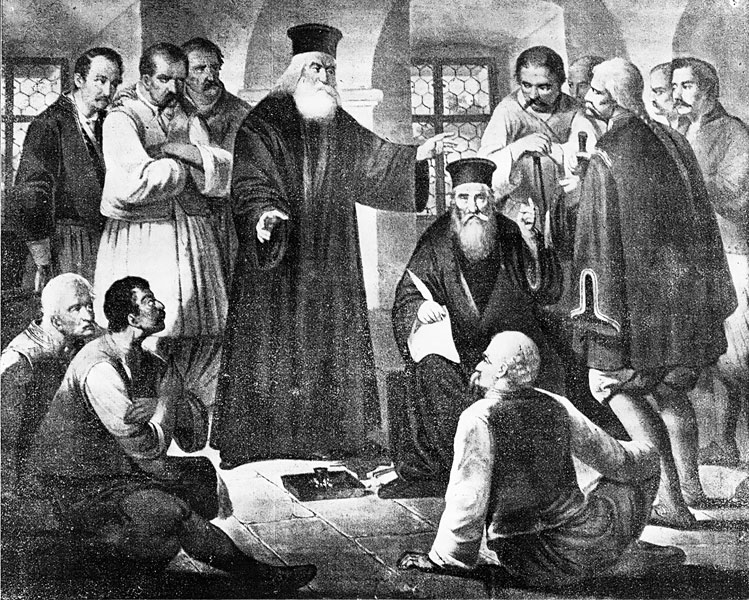
Hadži-Ðera and Hadži-Ruvim with conspirators.

The banished sipahi and imperial Muslims organized a rebellion against the Janissaries with the support of the Serbs in mid-1802, but it failed, resulting in further oppression. The Dahije learnt of a conspiracy between the Serbs and Mustafa Pasha's associates (who wanted revenge) to rise against the Dahije, forged in 1803, as well as a letter written by obor-knez Aleksa Nenadović in Valjevo nahiya to Austrian officer Mitesser in Habsburg Semlin (Zemun). Aleksa Nenadović in Valjevo and merchant Karađorđe in Šumadija, both Free Corps and militia veterans, planned for uprising. Nenadović believed and hoped for a new Austro-Turkish war and occupation of Serbia, however, there was no chance that this would happen due to the political landscape. Karađorđe met with Austrian Serb associates in Ostružnica where he bought gunpowder, then crossed the Morava to Resava, meeting with Milenko Stojković who was to rouse the people in the Požarevac and Smederevo nahiyas, then returned to Šumadija with a band of hajduks; these plans were made for supporting Hadji Mustafa Pasha's followers against the Dahije. The Dahije began to monitor Serbs more intensely after learning of Nenadović's letter, but they believed it was written by archimandrite Hadži-Ruvim and held him accountable, as he had left his monastery in the beginning of 1803 following a dispute with the prnjavor (monastery village) subaşı in 1802. The Dahije were initially concentrating more on the Valjevo nahiya and were less informed on Karađorđe's plans in Šumadija. Hadži-Ruvim soon returned, and Aleksa asked him to leave the pashalik as he was in danger, and the Dahije might think that his return was a signal for rebellion, but he refused as he "wanted to share the fate of the people". Kučuk-Alija's associate Maksim of Guberevac made a body search on a priest at Ostružnica and found a letter of correspondence between Serbian knezes and imperial Turks, while the Dahije likely received information from Semlin gun smugglers about plans in Šumadija, at the beginning of 1804, which made the Dahije decide to kill Serb leaders in order to thwart a rebellion against them, force the Serbs into total submission, and continue ruling the pashalik.

== History ==
The Dahije leaders gave orders to their mütesellims and others, such as innkeepers, to kill Serb leaders, but still personally involved themselves. They made use of the innkeepers (handžije) and village henchmen (subaşı), known as especially cruel. S. Novaković believed that Mehmed-aga Fočić was tasked with overseeing the operation. The victims were obor-knezes (knežina mayors), knezes (village mayors), buljubašas (captains), merchants, clergy, and other chosen people. The decisions to kill Serb notables were made by the Dahije some time between 13–26 January [O.S. 1–14 January]. At first, the Dahije henchmen were sent to carry out the murders, and then the Dahije leaders themselves set out from Belgrade to carry out murders of selected people.

The newly appointed mütesellim of Kragujevac, Kučuk-Husejin, called on merchants to renew their trading rights, including former militia captain Mata, the knez Jovica, Mladen Milovanović, and Karađorđe, the latter refused to come. Kučuk-Husejin imprisoned the three, then killed Mata and Jovica. Those who were called upon but refused to attend were now sent after and killed, with Karađorđe surviving an attempt at Topola by Uzun-Mehmed and his 12 men. On 25 January [O.S. 13 January], a Turk sipahi named Asan-aga was murdered by Janićije Đurić below the Venčac mountain, which led to a manhunt by innkeeper Ibrahim of Topola, the innkeepers of Žabari and Šume, as well as others from Banja and Lipovac. Petar Jokić was approached by Ibrahim and asked to protect his inn from potential robbery. According to Gaja Pantelić, Uzun-Mehmed's gang had come to Topola during the manhunt and asked for Karađorđe's whereabouts.

The Dahije leaders decided that they personally kill some of the knezes, thus, Mehmed-aga Fočić went for Valjevo and Šabac nahiyas, Kučuk-Alija went for Smederevo, Ćuprija and Jagodina nahiyas, Mula-Jusuf went to Belgrade and Grocka nahiyas, while Aganlija seems to have stayed in Belgrade. The leaders each took a strong Janissary contingent with them into the nahiyas, leaving Belgrade on 27–28 January [O.S. 15–16 January] at latest, and some being back in Belgrade by 9 February [O.S. 28 January]. The Dahije killed people while travelling the nahiyas.

Mehmed-aga Fočić left Belgrade on 25 January [O.S. 13 January] for Valjevo where none of the Serb leaders awaited him, enraging him, then stayed at the konak (mansion) of the Bogovađa Monastery for two days where he secretly issued further orders of murder. His escorts, Stanoje Mihailović and Sima Marković, and the monastery archimandrite Hadži-Ruvim, were unaware of his plans. Fočić then returned for Valjevo on 28 January [O.S. 16 January], meeting up with Aleksa Nenadović, Ilija Birčanin and Milovan Grbović on a field, from where his 200 Janissaries took them to a dungeon. The knez Stanoje Mihailović was killed on 1 February [O.S. 20 January], at his home while preparing a meal for three of Fočić's men, sent by Fočić while he stayed at Bogovađa. The first victims are believed to have been knezes Stevan Palalija, Marko J. Čarapić and Stanoje Mihailović.

Mula-Jusuf burnt down the village of Vrčin in the Grocka nahiya, while Kučuk-Alija went into the Smederevo nahiya and cleansed the village of Baničina and killed several in Plana, then "beheaded in secrecy" in Ćuprija and went through the Požarevac nahiya, where the Livadice village was burnt down and many people were killed in Mlava, then returned to Belgrade.

Aleksa Nenadović and Ilija Birčanin were executed by beheading on 4 February [O.S. 23 January], with Fočić reading the intercepted conspiratory letter out loud. Their severed heads were put on display at Fočić's house. By 6 February [O.S. 25 January], the Dahije decided that all notable Serbs were to be beaten, so that what was left would become real "rayah, to serve well"; local Turks then began to attack chosen notables in their districts. By killing Nenadović, Birčanin, Marko and Vasa Čarapić, knez Petar of Gložane, and Karađorđe, the Dahije believed they would rid themselves of notable Serb militia commanders.

There are different accounts on the murder of Hadži-Ruvim: According to archpriest Matija Nenadović (the son of Aleksa), Hadži-Ruvim heard of the imprisonment of Nenadović and Birčanin and went to Belgrade Metropolitan Leontius, who instead of harboring him, gave him up to Aganlija, whose men had Hadži-Ruvim beheaded at the Varoš Gate. According to V. Karadžić, Hadži-Ruvim went to Belgrade and sought to hide with his nephew Petar Moler, who was the painter of Kučuk-Alija's mansions, but Kučuk-Alija sent him to Aganlija who threw in the dungeon. According to Zemun archpriest Mihailo Pejić, Leontius invited Hadži-Ruvim to Belgrade and asked him of the state of the people, to which he answered that "no words could describe the discontent and suffering", and advised the Metropolitan that the two cross into Austria, as the people planned an uprising against the Dahije. The Metropolitan then informed the Dahije of their discussion, and the Dahije arrested Hadži-Ruvim and brought him to Kučuk-Alija on 9 February [O.S. 28 January], then killed him the next day.

Karađorđe was surrounded and attacked by Uzun-Mehmed (the second or third attempt), it is believed on 12 February [O.S. 31 January], but Karađorđe managed to kill two or more of the attackers and fled into the woods, according to several accounts. Karađorđe went and met with hajduk leader Stanoje Glavaš.

In early February (the end of January according to Old Calendar) Fočić stayed at Šabac then secretly and quickly returned to Belgrade by boat where he and his associates discussed how to calm down the people after the murders. Archpriest Pejić wrote a letter to metropolitan Stefan Stratimirović some time between 11 February [O.S. 30 January] and 15 February [O.S. 3 February] saying "these days revenge was done on Serbs, which the Janissaries long wanted". By 16 February [O.S. 4 February], 72 severed heads had been brought to Belgrade.

The relative of Kučuk-Alija, who was captured during the subsequent uprising, acknowledged the Dahije intention to erase all more important people and to put new serfs and chiefs in their place. These newly appointed would then be imprisoned and held hostage until all weapons of the villagers be collected, after which every person that was over the age of 10 during the Austro-Turkish war be killed and the rest forcibly converted into Islam.

== Victims ==
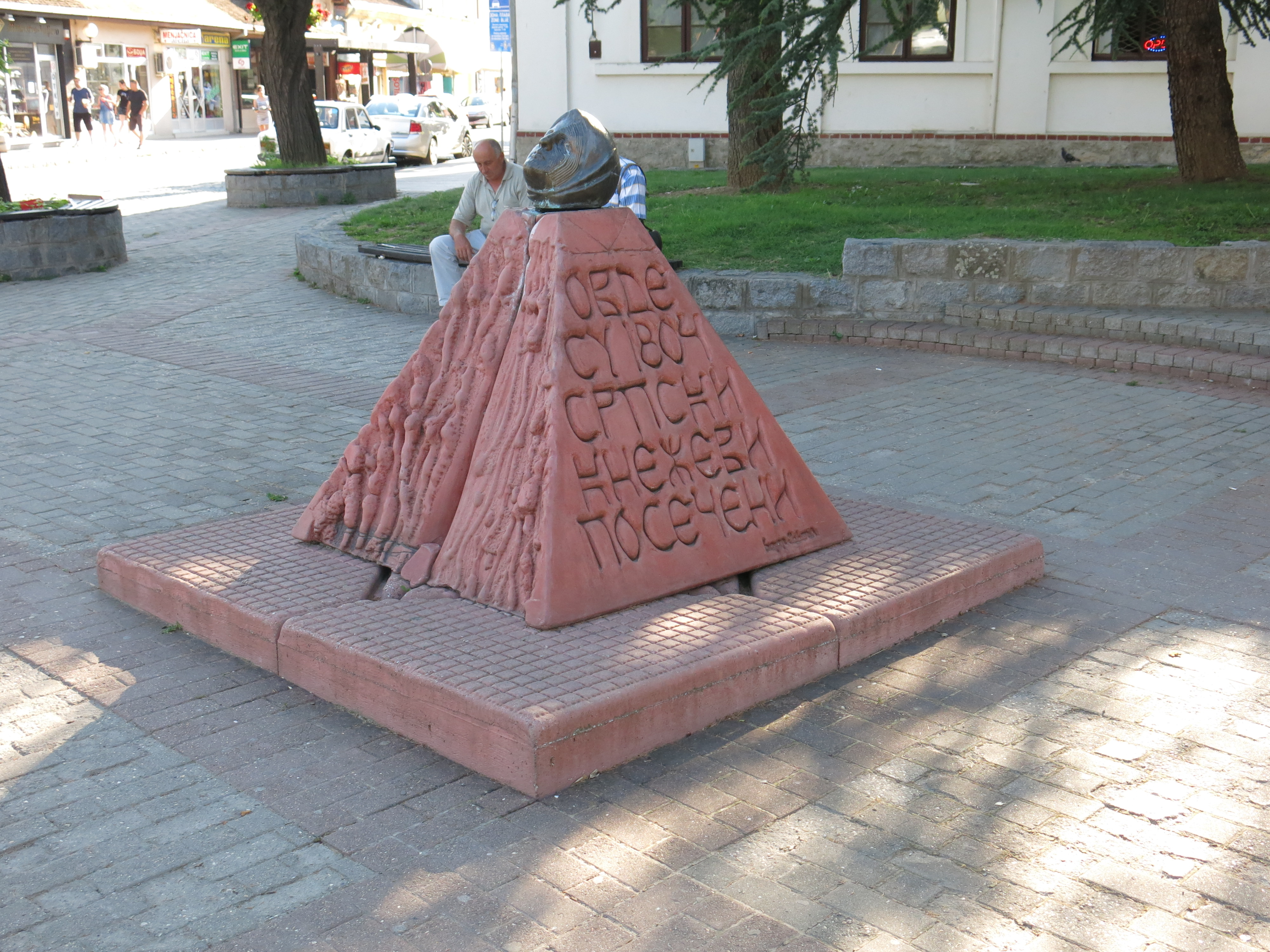
Memorial in Valjevo.

M. Vukićević concluded that most were killed around 4 February [O.S. 23 January], but some were killed prior and some after, depending on the route the Dahije took, with a "terrible week", as S. Novaković put it, being 29 January–5 February [O.S. 17–24 January]. A. Gavrilović (1864–1929) made a list of those murdered and concluded that the campaign stretched over some six weeks. The last victim was Hadži-Ruvim, who died on 10 February [O.S. 29 January]. The total number of victims was still unknown at the start of the 20th century. Notes regarding the beginning of the First Serbian Uprising included in Oestr. militärische Zeitschrift (1821) noted that 95 of "most distinguished were killed in 14 days". A letter of archpriest Mihailo Pejić that arrived at the Metropolitanate of Karlovci on 16 February [O.S. 4 February] mentions the decapitated heads of 72 knezes and priests which were brought to Belgrade. A petition to Russian envoy A. Italyansky at the Porte dated 15 May [O.S. 3 May] mentions 150 knezes and other notables killed. A report by Austrian officer Mitesser mentions 123 victims. It is currently estimated that around 100 heads were taken to Belgrade. Gavrilović found more information on those killed which he published in a 1904 work. Only a portion of the killed are known by name.

- Stevan Andrejić-Palalija, knez of Begaljica in the Grocka nahiya. Lured and cut down in Grocka.
- Marko Čarapić, knez (or obor-knez) of Beli Potok in the Grocka nahiya. Killed at a wedding in Kaluđerica.
- Janko Gagić, kmet (serf) and buljubaša (captain), from Boleč in the Grocka nahiya. Killed after giving himself up to save his kidnapped son.
- Stanoje Mihailović, knez from Zeoke, killed at his home by three of Mehmed-aga Fočić's men, on 26 January [O.S. 14 January] or 1 February [O.S. 20 January].
- Aleksa Nenadović, knez of Tamnava in the Valjevo nahiya. Captured with Ilija Birčanin, beheaded on order of Mehmed-aga Fočić on 4 February [O.S. 23 January].
- Ilija Birčanin, knez of Podgor in the Valjevo nahiya. Captured with Aleksa Nenadović, Beheaded on order of Mehmed-aga Fočić on 4 February [O.S. 23 January].
- Hadži-Ruvim, archimandrite of Bogovađa in the Valjevo nahiya. Imprisoned by Kučuk-Alija while guesting metropolitan Leontius at Belgrade. Tortured to death, died on 10 February [O.S. 29 January].
- Radosav Kalabić, knez of Jadar in the Zvornik nahiya (outside Belgrade Pashalik), and his friend priest Vilip, by impalement in the beginning.
- Hadži-Ðera, hegumen of the Moravci Monastery in the Rudnik nahiya. Killed in the monastery.
- Gavrilo Buđevac, buljubaša, from the Rudnik nahiya, a knez of Tavnik in the Rudnička Morava knežina. Murdered by Rudnik mutesellim Sali-aga.
- Mata, buljubaša, from Lipovac in the Kragujevac nahiya. Cut down by the Kragujevac mutesellim Kučuk-Husejin.
- Jovica from Knić in the Kragujevac nahiya. Cut down by the Kragujevac mutesellim Kučuk-Husejin.
- Nikola Ćirjanić from Orašac in the Kragujevac nahiya. Beaten to death by the Kragujevac mütesellim Kučuk-Husejin.
- Petar, obor-knez from Gložane in Ćuprija nahiya, lured to Ćuprija and killed by Kučuk-Alija.
- Rajica, knez from Zabrđe, priest Milosav in Gornja Mlava in the Požarevac nahiya, and Staniša from Požarevac nahiya, lured to Ćuprija and killed by Kučuk-Alija. According to K. Protić, they were killed in Požarevac by Kuçuk Sali Agha Arslanović.
- Teofan, knez of Malo Orašje, former militia buljubaša from Seone, in the Smederevo nahiya. According to K. Protić the Smederevo Turks under dizdar Gušo murdered him.
- Jovan, knez from Landovo in the Smederevo nahiya.
- Maksim, knez from Selevac in the Smederevo nahiya. His relative, priest Milovan was also killed, likely together with Maksim.
- Spasoje Ilić, knez of Lapovo, an old and respected man killed in broad daylight in Batočina.
- Jovo Carić or Jova Cerić, merchant in Soko, from Skela in the Valjevo nahiya, stabbed.
- A ferry captain in Ostružnica in the Belgrade nahiya.
- Vrčin village in Grocka nahiya burnt down by Mula-Jusuf.
- A momak of Mladen Milovanović, killed in Botunje.
- A bricklayer in Žabari.
- Several people in Velika Plana, relatives of hajduk Milovan.
- A sister who hid her brother "in a village" in Smederevo nahiya.
- Livadica village in Požarevac nahiya was burnt down and people were killed.
- The wife of merchant Koda in Provo (most likely Prugovo) in Požarevac nahiya was killed, a relative of hajduk Stevo.
- Several people in Mlava area.
- According to K. Nenadović, Stevan Katić, obor-knez from Rogača by Kosmaj, the older brother of Janko Katić and Marko Katić.
- Miloje and Marko, both obor-knez from Guberevac by Kosmaj.
- Three priests from the Šabac nahiya, Živko, Maksim, and an unnamed protosynkellos of the Bishop of Šabac Antim Zepos, were killed in Šabac in the following phase. The former two were stabbed, the latter cut into pieces in the town center (čaršija).

Many of the important people of the coming uprising were spared mostly by luck. Among those on the lists were Sima Marković, Janko Katić, Vasa Čarapić, Jakov Nenadović, Nikola Grbović, Cincar-Janko, Melentije Stevanović, Milenko Stojković and most notably, Karađorđe.

Graves

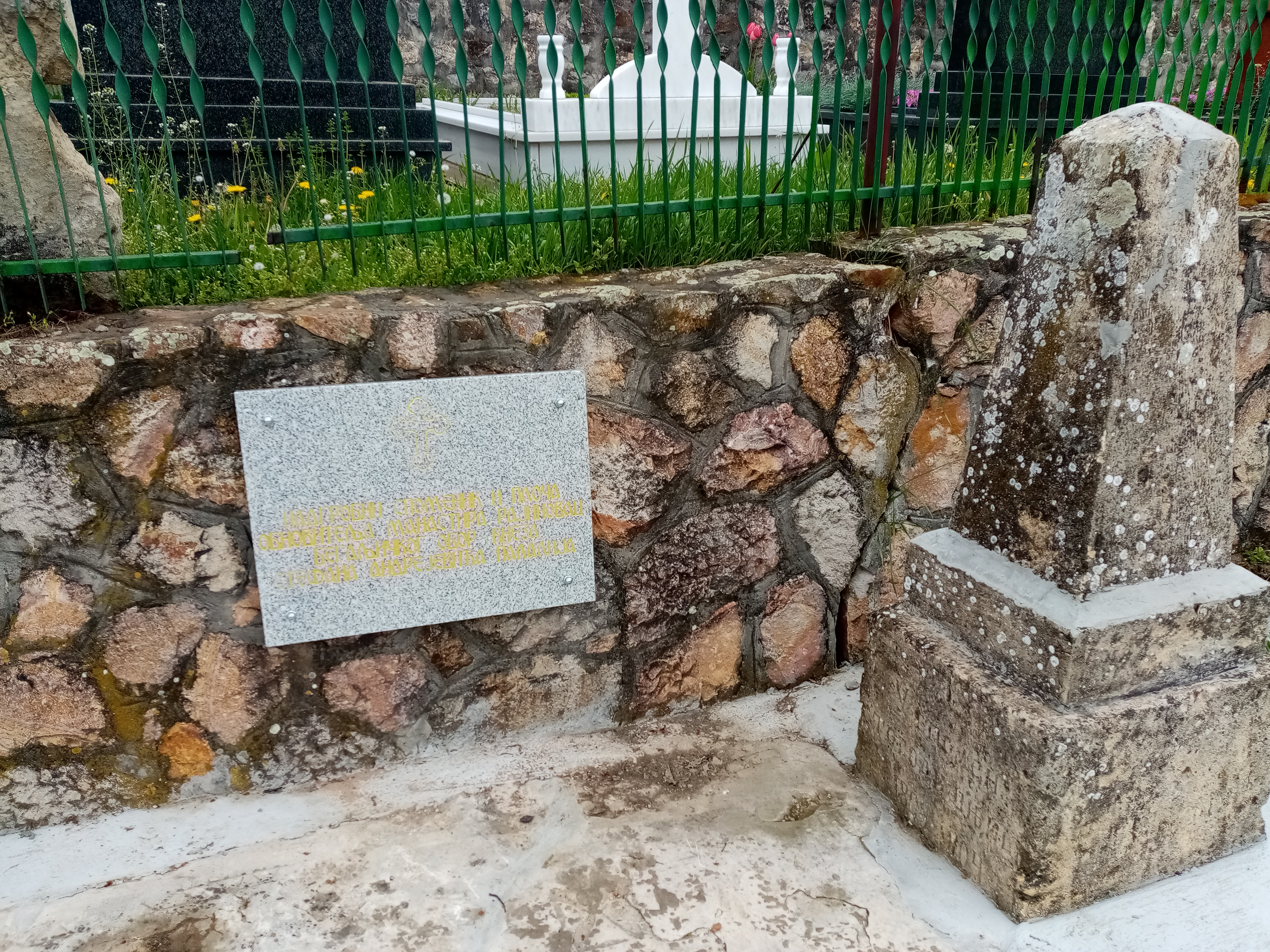
Grave of Stevan Palalija at the Rajinovac cemetery.

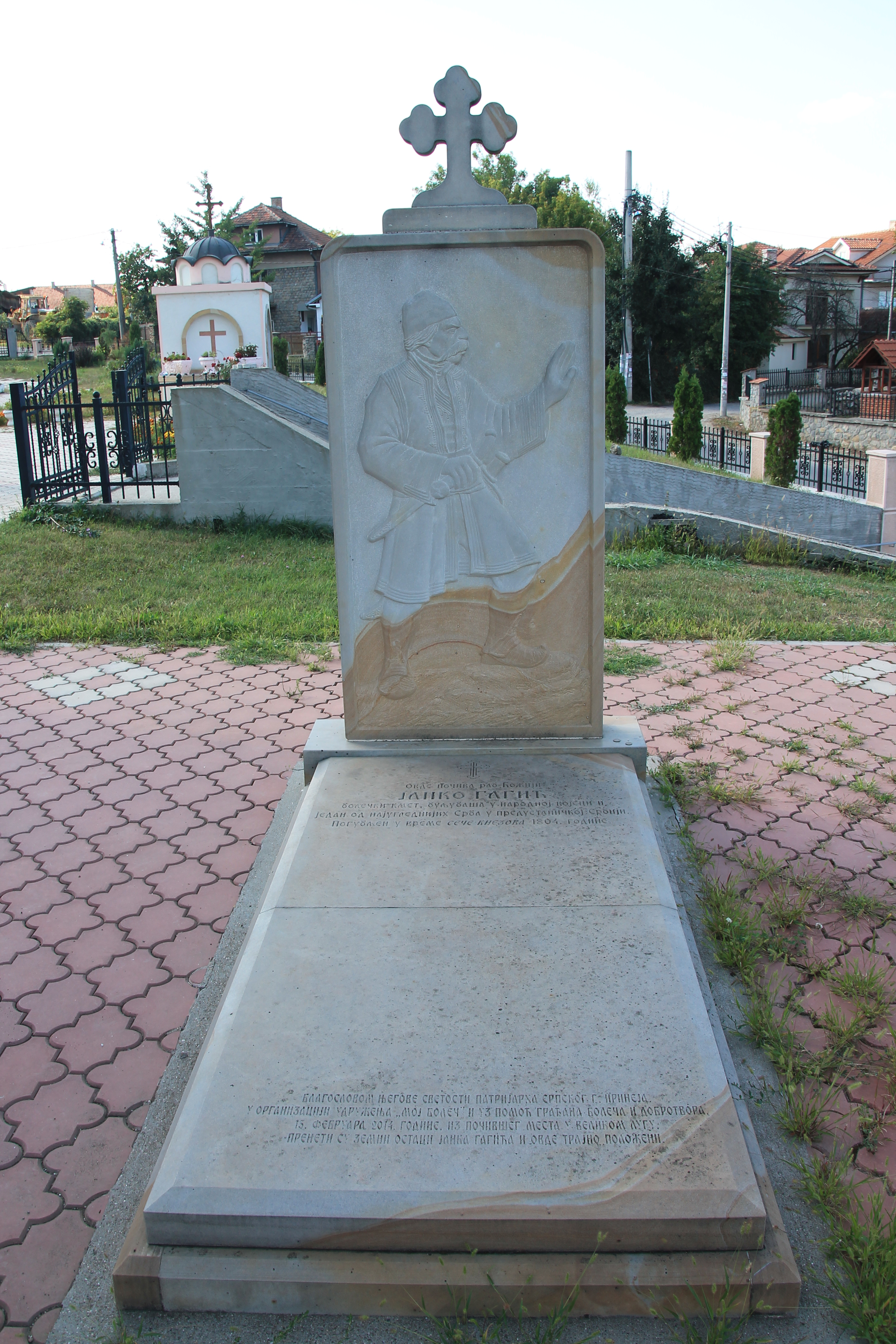
Grave of Janko Gagić in Boleč.

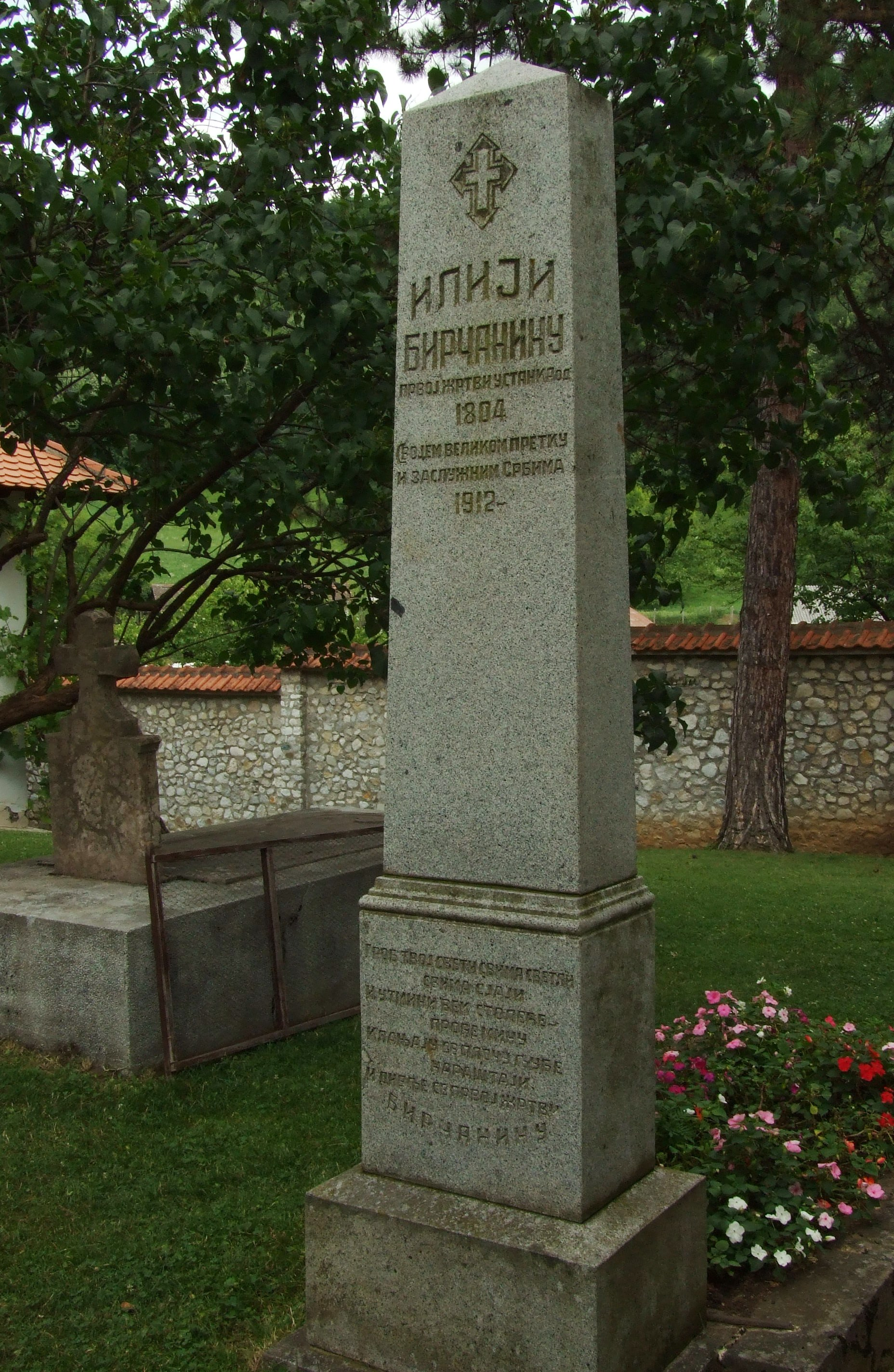
Grave of Ilija Birčanin at the Ćelije monastery.

== Aftermath and legacy ==
News of the murders led to flight of notables and their families, and these began to assemble and discuss rebellion, accompanied by hajduks who wintered at the time.

The economic hardships, evil administration, violence and "Slaughter of the Knezes" led to the uprising against the Dahije in 1804 and the start of the Serbian Revolution. Vuk Karadžić wrote how the Dahije sent Aganlija, the best of the four among the people, to pacify and advise them to refrain from rebellion and instead go home, that henceforth they would have a different and better approach and the zulum (injustice, atrocities) would stop. The Dahije tried to stop the uprising through talks on 4 March 1804, offering Karađorđe a huge sum of money and the title of vrhovni knez (top knez) of the Pashalik; Karađorđe answered "as long as I look at the graves of our Serb knezes who the Dahije slew, and as long as you do not kill me as you did the other knezes, there will be no peace between us".

The events are known in Serbian epic poetry, such as poems by Filip Višnjić and others.

== See also ==
- Eliticide

== Sources ==
- Bodrožić, Đuro (2019). "Nacionalna država u Prvom srpskom ustanku". Politička revija. 62 (4): 87–107.
- Gavrilović, Andra (1904). "Сеча кнезова". Црте из историје ослобођења Србије. Belgrade: Нздање дворске књижаре Мите Стајића у Београду. pp. 7–42 – via Archive.org.
- Ljubojević, Ratko Lj.; Radović-Stojanović, Jelena V. (2022). "Терор османских власти над српским народом". Тематски зборник „СТРАХ У НАУЧНОМ И УМЕТНИЧКОМ СТВАРАЛАШТВУ“. Лепосавић: Институт за српску културу Приштина: 495–510. ISBN 978-86-89025-80-4.
- Nedeljković, Slaviša D.; Đorđević, Miloš Z. (2015). "Политичке прилике у београдском пашалуку у предвечерје српске револуције (1787-1804)". Teme. XXXIX (3). Niš: 965–969.
- Novaković, Stojan (1904). Устанак на дахије 1804 [Uprising against the Dahije]. Штампано у Државној штампарији – via Archive.org.
- Novaković, Stojan (1906). Tursko carstvo pred srpski ustanak, 1780–1804. Beograd Davidović – via Archive.org.
- Pantelić, Dušan (1949). Београдски пашалук пред Први српски устанак (1794–1804). Belgrade: Српска академија наука.
- Pavlović, Dragoljub M. (1990). "Учесници српских үстанака од 1804. до 1815. године из Рудничке и Пожешке нахије" [Participants aux insurrections serbes de 1804 et 1815 nés dans les nahies de Rudnik et de Požega] (PDF). Зборник радова Народног музеја у Чачку. XX: 115–131.
- Protić, Kosta (1893). "Ратни догађаји из првога српског устанка под Карађорђем Петровићем 1804—1813". Годишњица Николе Чупића. XIII. Državna štamparija.
- Vukićević, Milenko M. (1907). Карађорђе (1752–1804) [Karađorđe]. Vol. 1. Државна штампарија Краљевине Србије – via Archive.org.
