= Dionysios Papazoglou =

Orthodox metropolitan of Belgrade and Buda

- Metropolitan of Belgrade; Metropolitan of Buda
- Church: Metropolitanate of Karlovci (1793–1828); Ecumenical Patriarchate (1784–1791)
- Metropolis: Belgrade, Buda
- Installed: 1784
- Term ended: 1791

Orders
- Rank: Metropolitan

Personal details
- Born: Dionysios Papazoglou; 1750 Kozani, Ottoman Empire
- Died: 28 February 1828 (aged 77–78) Szentendre, Habsburg monarchy
- Denomination: Eastern Orthodox
- Residence: Belgrade (1784–1791); Szentendre (1793–1828)

Dionysios Papazoglou (Serbian: Дионисије Папазоглу; 1750–1828), known in Serbian as Popović (Serbian: Дионисије Поповић), was an Eastern Orthodox Metropolitan of Belgrade in 1783–1791 and of Buda in 1791–1828.

Papazoglou was an ethnic Greek, born in Kozani in 1750. He studied at the Constantinopolitan Academy of the Ecumenical Patriarchate. At first, he wanted to be an ordinary priest, but after his wife's early death, he became a monk at Mount Athos. He had encyclopaedic knowledge of the bible and became the tutor of the Wallachian knyaz. In 1784, the old and sick Jeremias was succeeded by the 34-year-old Dionysios as the Metropolitan of Belgrade. He learnt good Serbian in a couple of years. In 1788 he fled to Austria and offered his service to the Austrian war propaganda in the Austro-Turkish War (1788–1791), agitating Serbs to fight and serve in the Serbian Free Corps. He actively supported the Habsburg army and this was his own decision, as the Ecumenical Patriarchate (seated in Constantinople) had no intent of clashing with the Porte. In a speech in Belgrade dated 17/28 August 1791, he called on the Serb population to flee to the Habsburg monarchy, claiming that the Turks would transfer them, disloyal subjects, to Anatolia, and settle Yörüks in their place. Hadži-Ruvim accused Dionysios and Wallace in 1793 of giving up Belgrade to the Turks.

While serving as the metropolitan of Buda, he worked to have the Greek parishes in Habsburg territory separated from the Metropolitanate of Karlovci. He served as the metropolitan of Buda until his death, recorded on 28 February 1828.

== See also ==
- Antim Zepos

== Sources ==
- Jovičin, Miroslav (31 March 2024). "O избору митрополита Стефана Стратимировића, митрополиту па владици Дионизију, Риги од Фере". KCNS.
- Radosavljević, Nedeljko (2007). Православна црква у Београдском пашалуку 1766-1831. Istorijski institut. pp. 92–93. ISBN 978-86-7743-065-8.
- Vuković, Sava (1996). Српски јерарси од деветог до двадесетог века [Serbian Hierarchs from the 9th to the 20th Century]. Евро, Унирекс, Каленић. pp. 168–169.
