= Hadži-Ruvim =

Serbian religious artist (1752–1804)

Hadži Ruvim Nenadović
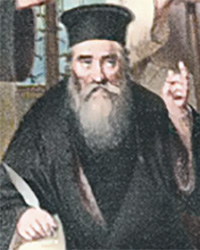
- Born: Rafailo Nenadović; 19 April 1752; Babina Luka, Sanjak of Smederevo (now Serbia)
- Died: 29 January 1804 (aged 51); Belgrade Fortress
- Cause of death: Beheading
- Other name: Nešković
- Spouse: Marija Simeunović (d. 1783)

Ecclesiastical career
- Religion: Eastern Orthodoxy
- Church: Serbian Church

Hadži-Ruvim (Serbian Cyrillic: Хаџи-Рувим; 19 April 1752 – 29 January 1804), born Rafailo Nenadović (Serbian Cyrillic: Рафаило Ненадовић), was a Serbian Orthodox archimandrite (superior abbot) of the Bogovađa Monastery, near Lajkovac, an artist and engraver. He was part of a plot to overthrow the Dahije, renegade Janissaries who had revolted against the Ottoman Sultan Mahmud II and taken control of the Sanjak of Smederevo. He was jailed and later killed in the event known as the Slaughter of the Knezes. Hadži-Ruvim was an artist, wood carver, engraver and book collector. He left notes and drawings on empty pages at the monasteries he visited.

== Early life ==
Rafailo Nenadović was born on 19 April [O.S. 8 April] 1752 in the village of Babina Luka, in the Valjevo nahija of the Sanjak of Smederevo (also known in historiography as the Belgrade Pashalik). He was one of four sons born to Nenad "Neško" (hence the patronymics Nenadović and Nešković) and Marija, also known by the diminutive Mara. The eldest of the four sons, Nikola, was the father of the revolutionary Petar Nikolajević Moler (1775–1816). His paternal family hailed from the Nikšić tribe (now in Montenegro).

According to the Serbian linguist and folklorist Vuk Karadžić, Nenadović ran into trouble in his youth when he mischievously disguised himself as a girl to attend a Turkish girls' prelo (weaving-session, traditional women's gathering). As this was forbidden (haram), the Turks condemned him to hang and went searching for him. He fled his home and hid in the monasteries, where he was schooled, and when his act had been forgotten, he returned home. Other historians maintain that he turned to the monasteries due to his thirst for knowledge and love of books. He learned Greek.

On 13 May 1774, Nenadović married Marija Simeunović, a woman from Dokmir, with whom he had a son and daughter. That year, he was ordained a priest by Bishop Evstratije of Užice, at the Ćelije Monastery, and served in his home village. He did wood carving and woodcutting. Some of his carved wooden crosses date to this period and are considered to be masterpieces of ecclesiastical art.

== Religious service ==
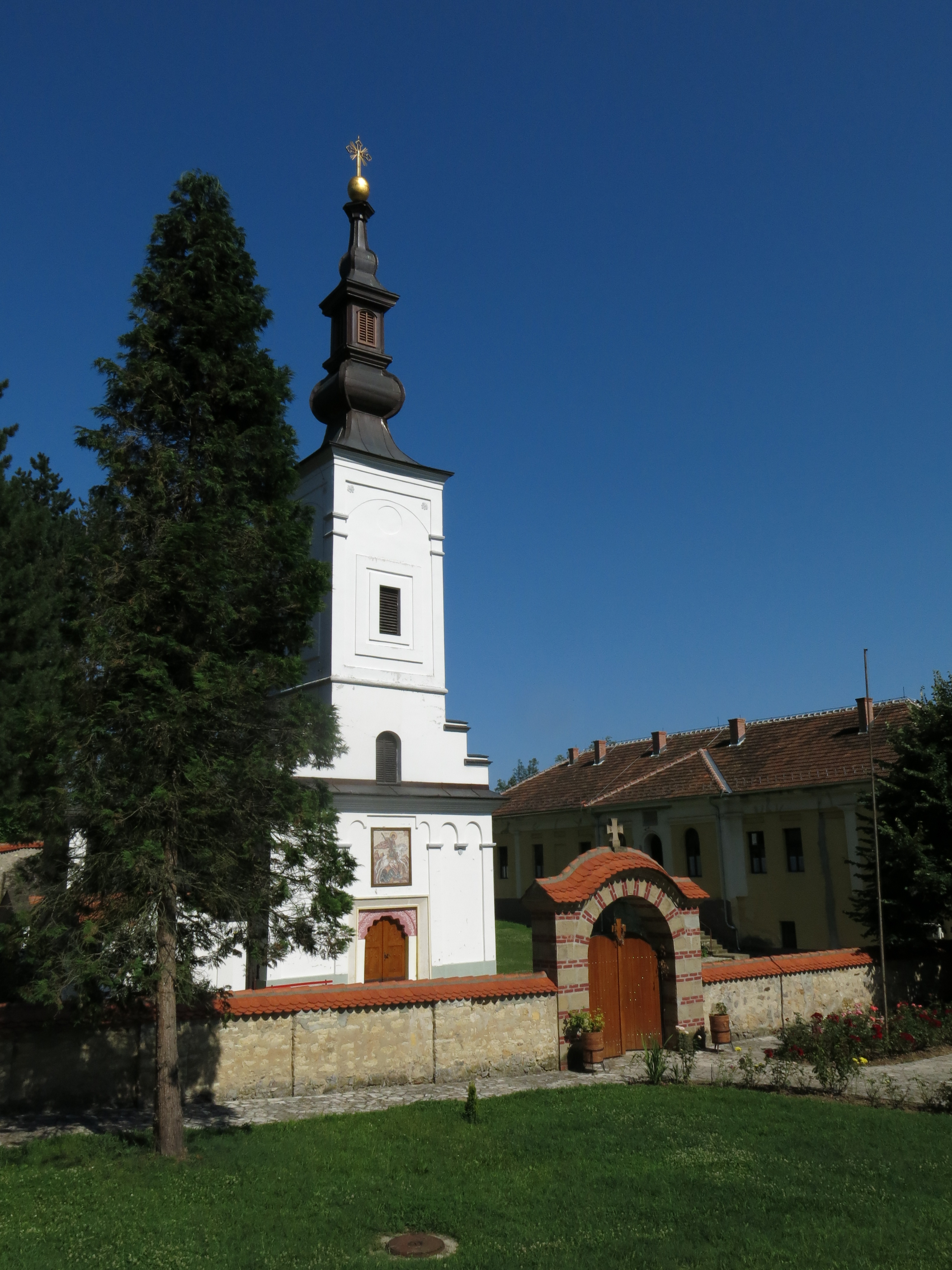
Ruvim took monastic vows at the Bogovađa Monastery. It was destroyed in the 1788–91 war, then reconstructed upon his return.

Following his wife's death in 1783, Nenadović took his monastic vows and adopted the name Ruvim at the Bogovađa Monastery. He made a pilgrimage (hadžiluk; hence the prefix "hadži") to the Holy Land, Jerusalem, in 1784 and returned in 1785. On 25 May 1786, he was appointed the hegumen (monastery head) of the Voljavča Monastery. He remained there until 1788, the beginning of the Austro-Turkish War (1788–91), or by 6 April 1789 at the latest, when the Ottomans burned down the monastery, along with many others in the Belgrade Pashalik. Serbs participated in the war, managing to occupy the pashalik for the Austrians. Hadži-Ruvim fled with the brotherhood, saving some of the monastery's treasures. He recorded that the Ottomans had looted much of the inventory. For a while, he was at the Velika Remeta Monastery at Fruška Gora, in the Habsburg monarchy. When the war cooled down in 1791, he returned to the Belgrade Pashalik, not to Voljavča, but Bogovađa, which had also been burned down.

Hadži-Ruvim recorded that five monasteries and eight churches had been destroyed in the Valjevo nahiya during the war. Bogovađa was repaired by Hadži-Ruvim, hegumen Vasilije Petrović and jeromonah (priest-monk) Hadži-Đera over the years, with work starting on 13 June 1791. Hadži-Ruvim's trip to Sarajevo in March 1792 is shrouded in mystery, and three hypotheses have been proposed for the reasons behind his visit. One is that he went to collect funds for the reconstruction of Bogovađa; that he feared for his life and took refuge in Bosnia; or that went to retrieve the stolen defter of Voljavča. A new theory is that he went to Sarajevo to recruit builders for Bogovađa, although the other three theories should not be neglected, as noted by the historian Vladimir Krivošejev. Work on the monastery was finished in 1794. Danilo, the Metropolitan of Šabac–Valjevo, promoted Hadži-Ruvim to the position of archimandrite on 26 October 1795. An interesting note is that Hadži-Ruvim had signed himself as archimandrite already in 1790, which suggests that he had already been promised the title by the time the monastery was renewed.

Apart from the Holy Land and Fruška Gora, Hadži-Ruvim visited Hilandar, Studenica, and monasteries in the Podrinje and Ovčar regions, among others, and left notes and drawings on empty pages at the monasteries he visited. In one note, he called the Ottoman Empire and the sultan "God-hating". In another, dated August 1793, Hadži-Ruvim blamed the Greek metropolitan of Belgrade, Dionysius Papazoglou, and Austrian feldmarschall Valis, for the surrender of Belgrade.

After the war, Sultan Selim III promised the Serbs some privileges, but these barely materialized. In 1801, renegade Janissaries known as the Dahije seized control of Belgrade and the Sanjak of Smederevo, and the Serbs' situation worsened once again. On 15 December 1801, they murdered Hadji Mustafa Pasha, the Vizier of Belgrade (1793–1801). Prominent Serbs sought the right moment to rise up and revive the Serbian state, and conspired throughout the sanjak. Hadži-Ruvim was a party to this movement.

== Plot against the Dahije and death ==
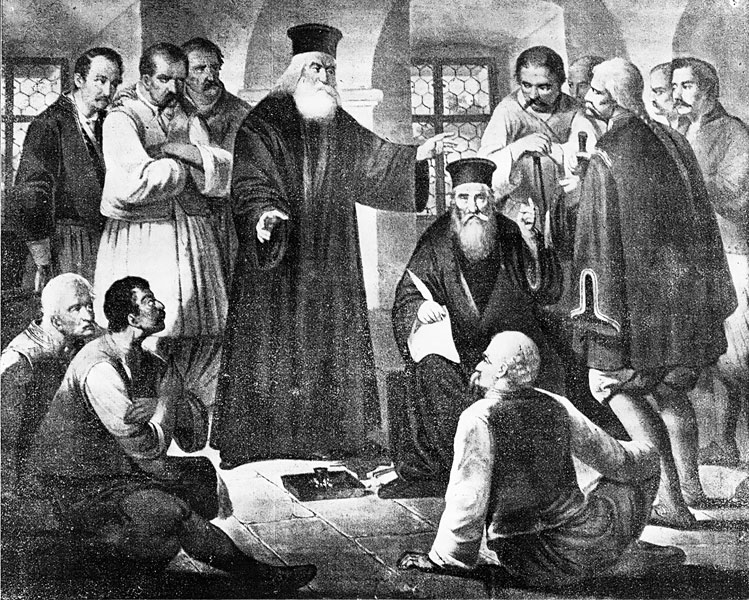
Hadži-Ðera and Hadži-Ruvim (sitting) with conspirators, in a painting by Pavle Simić (1818–1876).

In early 1802, some Ottoman sipahi and Mustafa Pasha's men, in agreement with the Serbian knezes, attempted to remove the Dahije. Fighting raged in Požarevac, but the Dahije emerged triumphant. Despite this, the sipahi and the Serbs continued to plot their removal. Although antagonistic elements, the tyranny of the Dahije forced the sipahi and the Serbs to cooperate. The Serbs, organizing themselves in western Serbia (where knez Aleksa Nenadović was the leading figure) and Šumadija, wanted as the sipahi to return the state of Mustafa Pasha's rule, but needed securities – the status of Christians in the Ottoman Empire, as history told, was never permanent. In 1803, plans were processed and consultations made regarding this. The sipahi worked on one side, the Serbian seniors (starešine) and knezes (subject village heads) on the other.

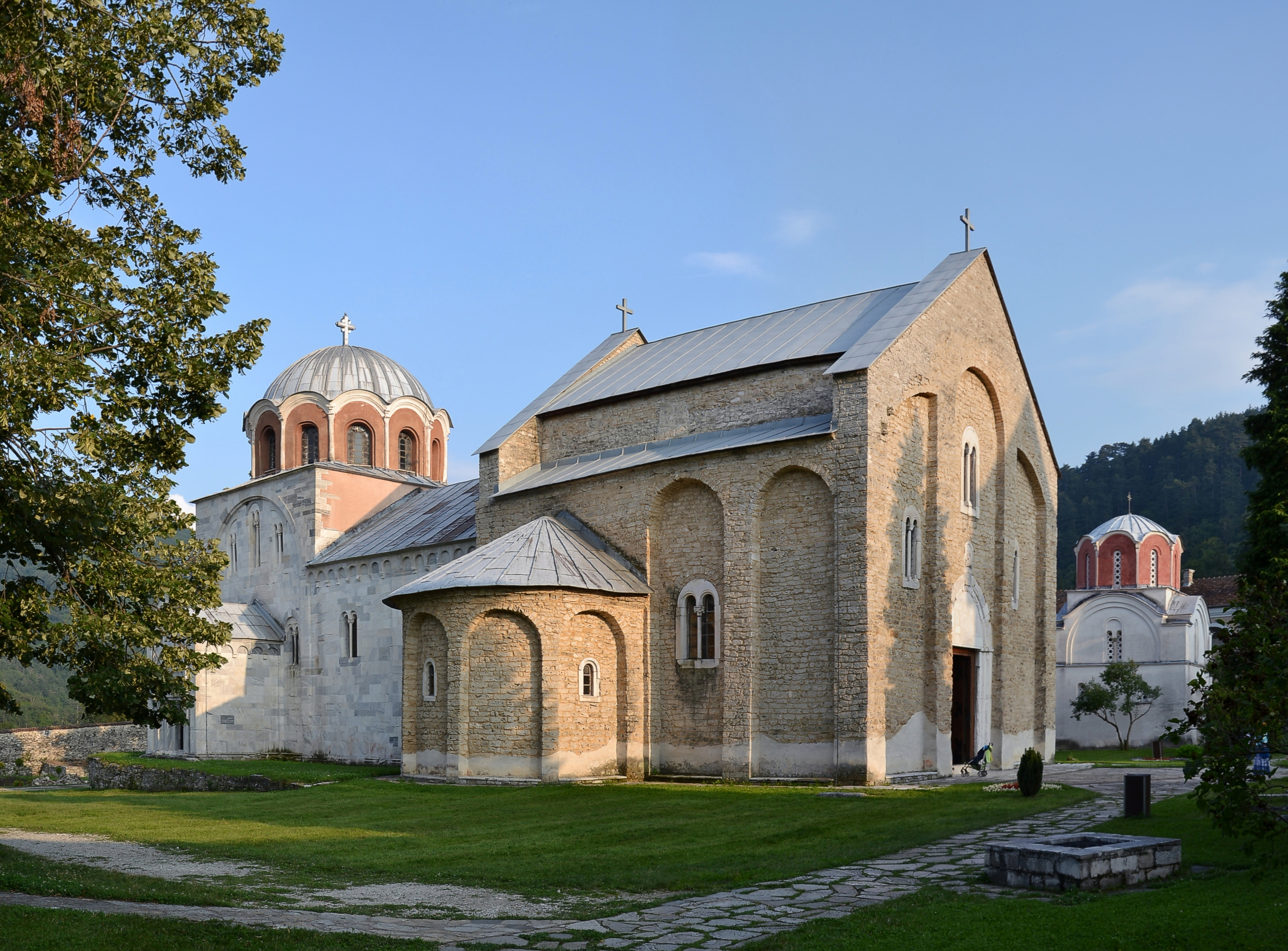
Hadži-Ruvim left the Belgrade Pashalik for the Studenica monastery after increased tensions in early 1803.

As a reputable church leader, protector of his people and great artist, Ruvim was for years targeted by the Dahije who tried to remove him by all means. It is considered that Hadži-Ruvim wrote the appeal in the name of twelve knezes to the Ottoman sultan, a petition for aid against the tyranny of the Dahije, based on which the sultan seriously threatened the Dahije. A monk had informed the Dahije that twelve knezes secretly met at Bogovađa in January 1803. Tradition holds that the letter was written by Hadži-Ruvim and his disciple Hadži-Đera, and that the knezes swore Oath before Hadži-Ruvim that they would rise up against the Dahije. As recorded by Vuk Karadžić, Hadži-Ruvim had a quarrel with the subaša of the prnjavor (parish settlement) in 1802, then complained several times to knez Aleksa Nenadović to have the subaša replaced (which would have been easy during Mustafa Pasha's rule), but Nenadović was unable to do him the favour. Because of the conspiracy (which the Dahije later learnt of) and quarrel, Hadži-Ruvim was forced to hide in the monasteries of Nikolje, Studenica, and on Mount Athos. He left Bogovađa for Studenica in the beginning of 1803. A manuscript in Nikolje dated 9 March 1803 records him arriving there on flight from Bogovađa. From Studenica, he sent fourteen messages to people in the Belgrade Pashalik, one of which was recorded to have arrived in Valjevo on 29 March. These messages called the Serbs to prepare an uprising against the Dahije. He also visited the Ovčar-Kablar monasteries. By Easter he arrived at Mount Athos.

After visiting the monasteries, he returned home to Bogovađa in late autumn 1803. Meanwhile, another conspiracy letter had been written by knez Aleksa Nenadović (or prota Matija Nenadović in his name) to Austrian major Paul von Mitesser in Zemun that asked of the Austrians to prepare ammunition and officers to help them "get rid of the Dahije". Upon his return to Bogovađa, Hadži-Ruvim received a message from Aleksa Nenadović asking him to flee, as the Turks wrongly accused him of writing that letter to the Austrians, which was intercepted on the Sava ferry by the Dahije. The letter had been intercepted while Hadži-Ruvim was away from the Belgrade Pashalik, and his return might have been viewed by the Dahije as a signal for uprising, therefore they held him accountable. Nenadović asked Hadži-Ruvim to leave the Belgrade Pashalik once again, so as to leave suspicion solely on Nenadović, as it was believed that Hadži-Ruvim was out of danger. Hadži-Ruvim did not listen to Nenadović, whom he messaged that he "had enough of fleeing and wandering."

After the Dahije intercepted Nenadović's letter, they increased the monitoring of Christians. They then learnt of further plans after finding a corresponding letter between the chieftains and the Ottoman government in a frisking of a priest in Ostružnica. The Dahije now took serious measures to suppress any plans, and decided to assault all notable Serbs, and to place new knezes and seniors in their place, then hold the notable Serbs as hostages until the confiscation of weapons from the rayah. They then planned to kill male adults, and employ the rest into their army and Islamize them. The Dahije began to take measures, especially in the Valjevo area. The Dahije sent secret orders to their muteselims to kill each of their knez on the given day. It seems that Mehmed-aga Fočić was tasked with overseeing the operation. The victims were obor-knezes, knezes, buljubašas and other chosen people. The killings began on 23 January. By 25 January, the Dahije decided that all notable Serbs were to be assaulted, so that what was left would become real "rayah, to serve the Turks well". Other Turk lords then began to attack chosen notable people in their districts. Karađorđe, who had led plans in Šumadija, survived attempts. According to contemporary accounts, heads were put on public display at the Valjevo town square to serve as an example to those who might plot against the rule of the Dahije.

There are different accounts on the murder of Hadži-Ruvim, which is dated to 29 January 1804:

- According to archpriest Matija Nenadović (the son of Aleksa), Hadži-Ruvim heard of the imprisonment of Nenadović and Birčanin and went to Belgrade Metropolitan Leontius, who instead of harboring him, gave him up to Aganlija, whose men had Hadži-Ruvim beheaded at the Varoš Gate.
- According to V. Karadžić, Hadži-Ruvim went to Belgrade and sought to hide with his nephew Petar Moler, who was the painter of Kučuk-Alija's mansions, but Kučuk-Alija sent him to Aganlija who threw in the dungeon, after which he was slaughtered, "they say that they dragged him with pliers and cut off his breasts and the meat below his armpits, then killed him".
- According to Zemun archpriest Mihailo Pejić, Leontius invited Hadži-Ruvim to Belgrade and asked him of the state of the people, to which he answered that "no words could describe the discontent and suffering", and advised the Metropolitan that the two cross into Austria, as the people planned an uprising against the Dahije. The Metropolitan then informed the Dahije of their discussion, and the Dahije arrested Hadži-Ruvim and brought him to Kučuk-Alija on 9 February [O.S. 28 January], then killed him the next day.

Hadži-Ruvim was later buried in the porta of the St. Michael's Cathedral, Belgrade.

== Aftermath ==
The Uprising against the Dahije broke out on 15 February 1804, the day after the Orašac Assembly. One of Ruvim's crosses was used by hegumen Konstantin Vujanić from Čokešina to swear in and bless the hajduk band (četa) led by the Nedić brothers that fought the Turks in Vranjevac. The most beautiful and largest of his crosses (known as "Hadži-Ruvim's cross") was used by prota Matija Nenadović at the first Ruling Council of Revolutionary Serbia in 1805.

== Legacy and art ==
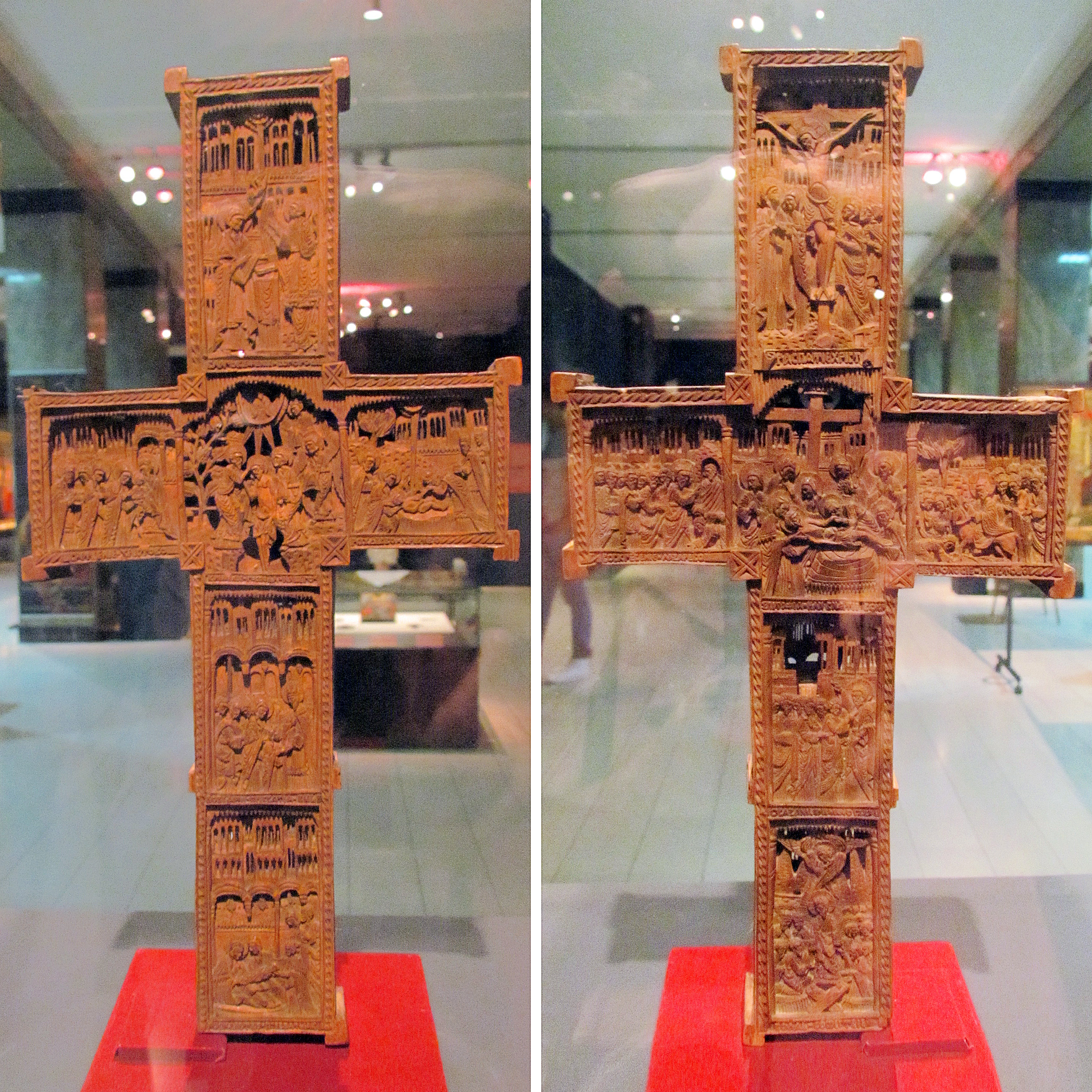
Hadži-Ruvim's Votive Cross, held at Čokešina monastery.

His death is included in Serbian epic poems, including poems recorded from contemporary guslar (bard) Filip Višnjić.

One of the most important persons of the Bogovađa brotherhood at the Bogovađa Monastery, archimandrite Hadži-Ruvim was very interested in history, and at that time in Serbia there were not many people who established private libraries and wrote library bibliographies. He collected a list of his library books at the end of the 18th century (which was rare), "an endeavor worthy of recognition". A very literate and educated man, not only for commonfolk but for hierarchs as well, he collected books in which he drew initials, ornaments and miniatures. He recorded historical events and wars, the state of the Serbian people at that time in the Belgrade and Valjevo districts.

Hadži-Ruvim is regarded as one of the last great Serbian woodcarvers, graphic artists and artists-engravers of the 18th century. He was also known as the "carver of the Cross." He engraved Krušedol Monastery, and the covers for the Gospel with twenty-eight scenes from the lives of Christ, Mother of God and St. Stevan. His most beautiful engraved cross was the one for Čokešina Monastery dating from 1799. His artistry represents a fusion of traditional Serbian and European Late Baroque art, and therefore it can be said that he played a significant role in the development of arts in Serbia in the late 18th and early 19th century. His woodcuts were based on the Krušedol works, and included scenes of the life of Christ and the Mother of God (Bogorodica), and he decorated many books with his pen drawings, among others the works of the ktetors of the Bogovađa Monastery, knezes Pavle and Jovan Velimirović. He illustrated their figures on the basis of 16th-century frescoes. In Mionica there's a church famous for the icons belonging to the Hadži-Ruvim's art school.

Pavle Simić (1818–1876) illustrated the meeting of conspirators in a painting (included in the article).

Borivoje Marinković collected and published Ruvim's notes with commentary in two volumes (1989–90). Predrag Savić wrote the novel Kaluđeri i smrt about Hadži-Ruvim.

For his effort to liberate and defend the Serbian people, through which he paid with his head, he became a "national martyr". Milan Milićević said of him: "Peace be upon his patriotic soul, and his name glorious forever".

== Sources ==
- Idrizović, Nenad (1 June 2012), "Хаџи-Рувим Ненадовић – велики књигољубац", Православље (1085) (Internet ed.), SPC: 31–32, ISSN 0555-0114, archived from the original on 22 April 2014
- Karadžić, Vuk (1829). "Као Српски плутарх". Даница. 4. Vienna: 8–11.
- Krivošejev, Vladimir (1992). "Цртице за биографију Хаџи Рувима Нешковића" (PDF). Гласник. 26–27. Историјски архив Ваљево: 72–77.
- Marinković, Borivoje (1989). Hadži Ruvim: pre celine, pre smisla. Zapisi s komentarima (1777–1790) (in Serbian). Милић Ракић.
- Marinković, Borivoje (1990). Hadži Ruvim: pre celine, pre smisla. Zapisi s komentarima (1791–1803) (in Serbian). Милић Ракић.
- Milićević, Milan (1888). Поменик знаменитих људи у српскога народа новијега доба. Srpska kraljevska štamparija. pp. 776–780.
- Morison, W. A. (2012) [1942]. The Revolt of the Serbs Against the Turks 1804–1813. Cambridge University Press. ISBN 978-1-107-67606-0.
- Novaković, Stojan (1904). Устанак на дахије 1804 [Uprising against the Dahije]. Штампано у Државној штампарији – via Archive.org.
- Radosavljević, Nedeljko V. (2007). Православна црква у Београдском пашалуку 1766–1831 [The Orthodox Church in the Belgrade Pashalik 1766–1831]. Istorijski institut. ISBN 978-86-7743-065-8.
- Ranke, Leopold von (1847). History of Servia, and the Servian Revolution. J. Murray.
- Savić, Predrag (2013) [2001]. Хаџи Рувим [Hadži Ruvim] (PDF) (in Serbian). Smart Studio. Archived from the original (PDF) on 8 November 2016.
- Sekendek, Bogdan (2009). Kojekude... njegovim tragom. Šabac: Zadužbinarsko društvo "Prvi srpski ustanak" Mišar.
- Subašić, Boris (6 March 2016). "Тајна крста Хаџи-Рувима". Novosti.
- Subašić, Boris (19 January 2014). "Hadži Ruvim: Duhovni vođa srpskih ustanika, prva žrtva dahija". Novosti.
