= Marko J. Čarapić =

Serb knez and militia commander

Marko Čarapić
- Born: Beli Potok, Ottoman Empire (now Serbia)
- Died: Late January 1804; Kaluđerica, Ottoman Empire (now Serbia)
- Cause of death: Murdered during Slaughter of the Knezes
- Occupation: knez (or obor-knez) of Beli Potok
- Known for: Serb rural leader in Belgrade nahiya; Serb militia member; victim in the Slaughter of the Knezes
- Movement: Serb conspiratory group in the Belgrade Pashalik
- Opponent: Dahije

Marko Čarapić (Serbian: Марко Чарапић, fl. 1793–d. 1804) was a Serb village mayor (obor-knez) in Beli Potok in the Grocka nahiya (district) of the Belgrade Pashalik. He was among the conspirators in 1803 to overthrow the tyrannical Dahije. He was murdered during the Slaughter of the Knezes, while attending a wedding.

== Life ==
Čarapić was born in the village of Beli Potok below the Avala mountain. His paternal family hailed from Kuči, from where it fled following several Turk attempts to kidnap one of their girls. His father was Jovan Čarapić, and he had a younger brother named Marinko, while his paternal cousins were Vasa Čarapić and Tanasije Čarapić. The Čarapić cousins were influential Serbs in the Belgrade Pashalik, thus, they were despised by the Dahije; according to epic poetry, Dahije leader Mehmed-aga Fočić longed to kill Marko and Vasa, as they acted like "they were pashas, and I a subaša", similarly to Fočić's view of obor-knez Stevan Palalija and others. Vasa had served in the Serbian Free Corps in the Austro-Turkish war. The Dahije had a Janissary innkeeper in Beli Potok who promised the Čarapić that he would protect them from Turks, if they protected him from Serbs. When the Dahije sent an armed band to the inn to ask for their whereabouts, the innkeeper said they all left for the Avala. When Marko, Vasa and Tanasije heard of the band in the village, they descended and shot at them.

In 1803 there were conspiracies to throw off the tyrannical rule of the Dahije (the renegade Janissary leadership). Learning of the conspiracies, the Dahije decided to kill Serb leaders in order to thwart a rebellion against them, force the Serbs into total submission, and continue ruling the pashalik. The Dahije leaders gave orders to their mütesellims and others, such as Dahije henchmen and innkeepers, to kill Serb leaders, but eventually the Dahije leaders themselves set out from Belgrade to carry out murders of selected people, thus, Mehmed-aga Fočić went for Valjevo and Šabac nahiyas, Kučuk-Alija went for Smederevo, Ćuprija and Jagodina nahiyas, Mula-Jusuf went to Belgrade and Grocka nahiyas, while Aganlija seems to have stayed in Belgrade. Čarapić was among the first victims, along with knezes Palalija and Stanoje Mihailović. A Turk band arrived at his house, asking of his whereabouts, his wife telling them that he attended a wedding in Kaluđerica as a kum. The band immediately set out for Kaluđerica, while Marko's wife went up the Avala and told his cousins Vasa and Tanasije about this. The band encircled the house Marko was in, with all guests fleeing the property. Entering the house on trust, the band berated him for wielding weapons (which he didn't have at that time, as they were hidden during the wedding), riding a noble horse, and selling swine to Austria, which the Dahije had prohibited, and told him they brought judgement. They attacked and decapitated him. Vasa and Tanasije arrived at the house and saw the body, hunted the band down and managed to kill some of them, and got hold of Marko's head which they took with the body to Beli Potok and buried at the local cemetery.

Among other Grocka nahiya notables killed were knez Palalija and militia buljubaša (captain) Janko Gagić. The Slaughter of the Knezes led to the First Serbian Uprising and beginning of the Serbian Revolution.

Marko left three sons, Kosta, Gligorije and Jovan.

His cousins Vasa and Tanasije became generals in the uprising.

== See also ==
- Stevan Palalija
- First Serbian Uprising

== Sources ==
- Gavrilović, Andra (1904). "Сеча кнезова". Црте из историје ослобођења Србије. Belgrade: Нздање дворске књижаре Мите Стајића у Београду. pp. 7–42 – via Archive.org.
- Milićević, Milan Đ. (1888). Поменик знаменитих људи у српског народа новијега доба. Издање Чупићеве задужбине. pp. 822–826 – via Archive.org.
- Nenadović, Matija (1893). Kovačević, Ljubomir (ed.). Мемоари Матије Ненадовића [Memoirs of Matija Nenadović]. Srpska književna zadruga – via Archive.org.
- Novaković, Stojan (1904). Устанак на дахије 1804 [Uprising against the Dahije]. Штампано у Државној штампарији – via Archive.org.
- Pantelić, Dušan (1949). Београдски пашалук пред Први српски устанак (1794–1804). Belgrade: Српска академија наука.
- Vukićević, Milenko M. (1907). Карађорђе (1752–1804) [Karađorđe]. Vol. 1. Државна штампарија Краљевине Србије – via Archive.org.
