= Babina Luka =

- Village (Selo)
- Location within Serbia
- Coordinates: 44°21′N 19°57′E
- Country: Serbia
- District: Kolubara District
- Municipality: Valjevo

Population (2002)
  - Total: 772
- Time zone: UTC+1 (CET)
  - Summer (DST): UTC+2 (CEST)

Babina Luka is a village in the municipality of Valjevo, Serbia. According to the 2002 census, the village has a population of 772 people.

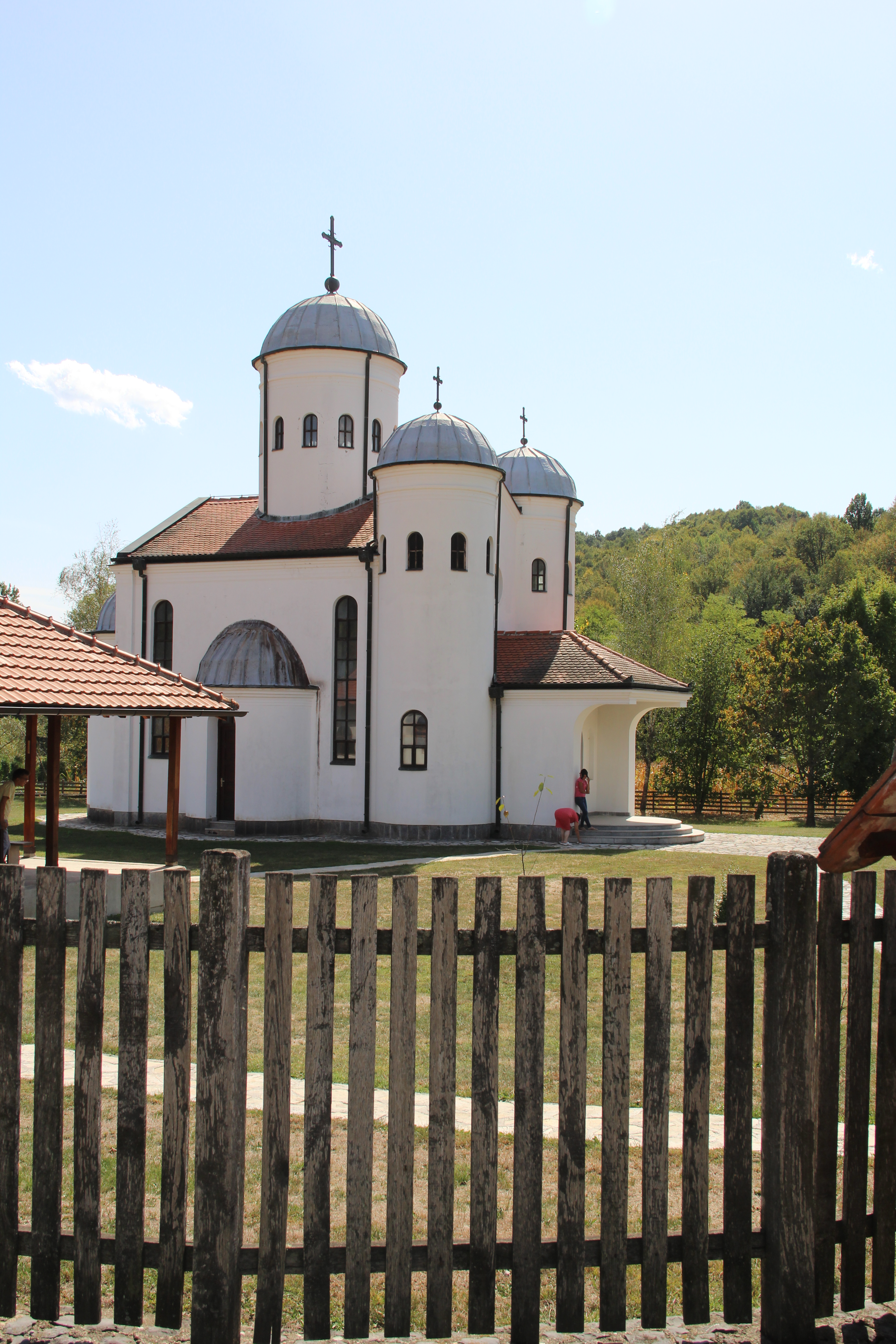
Babina Luka - church

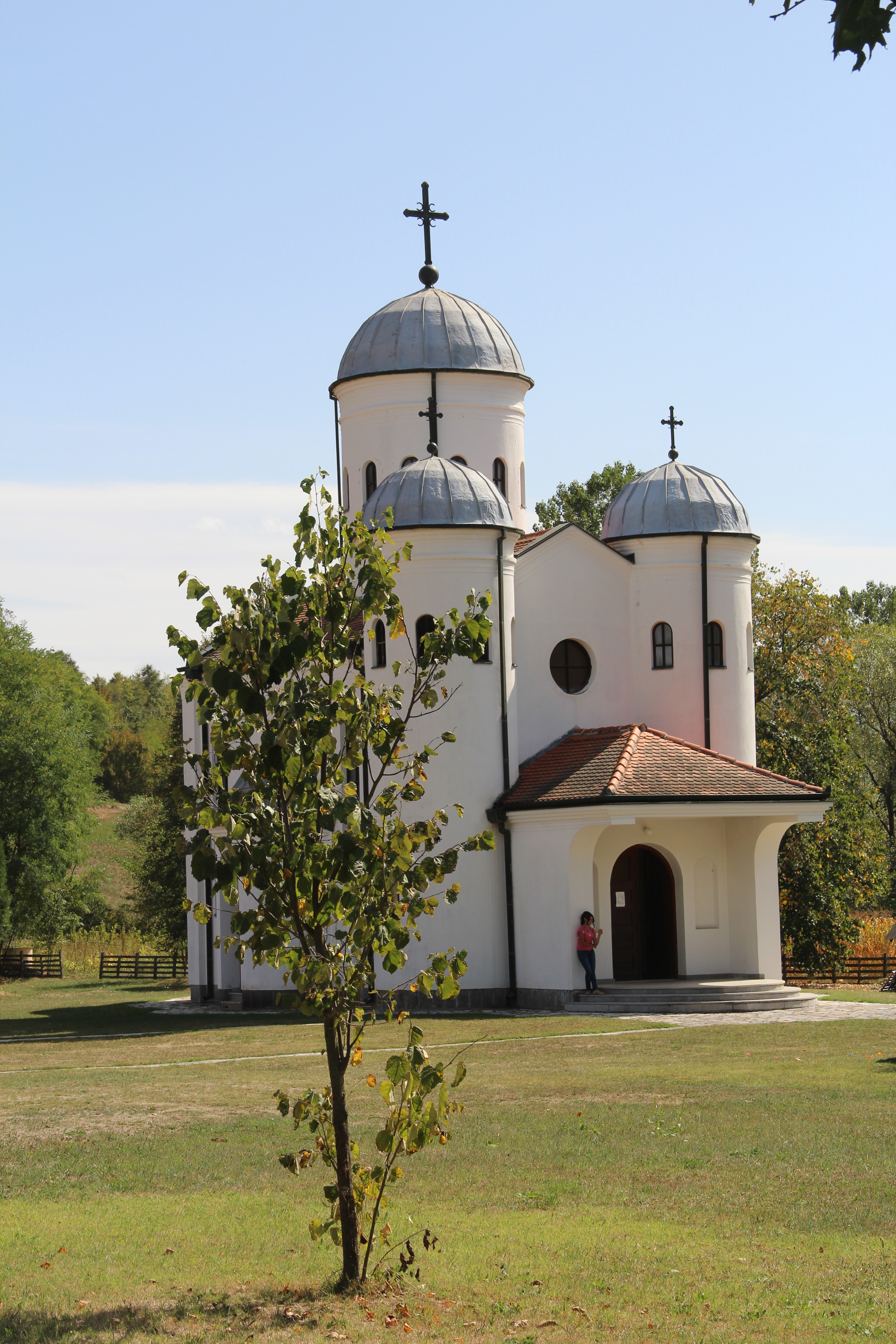
Babina Luka - church

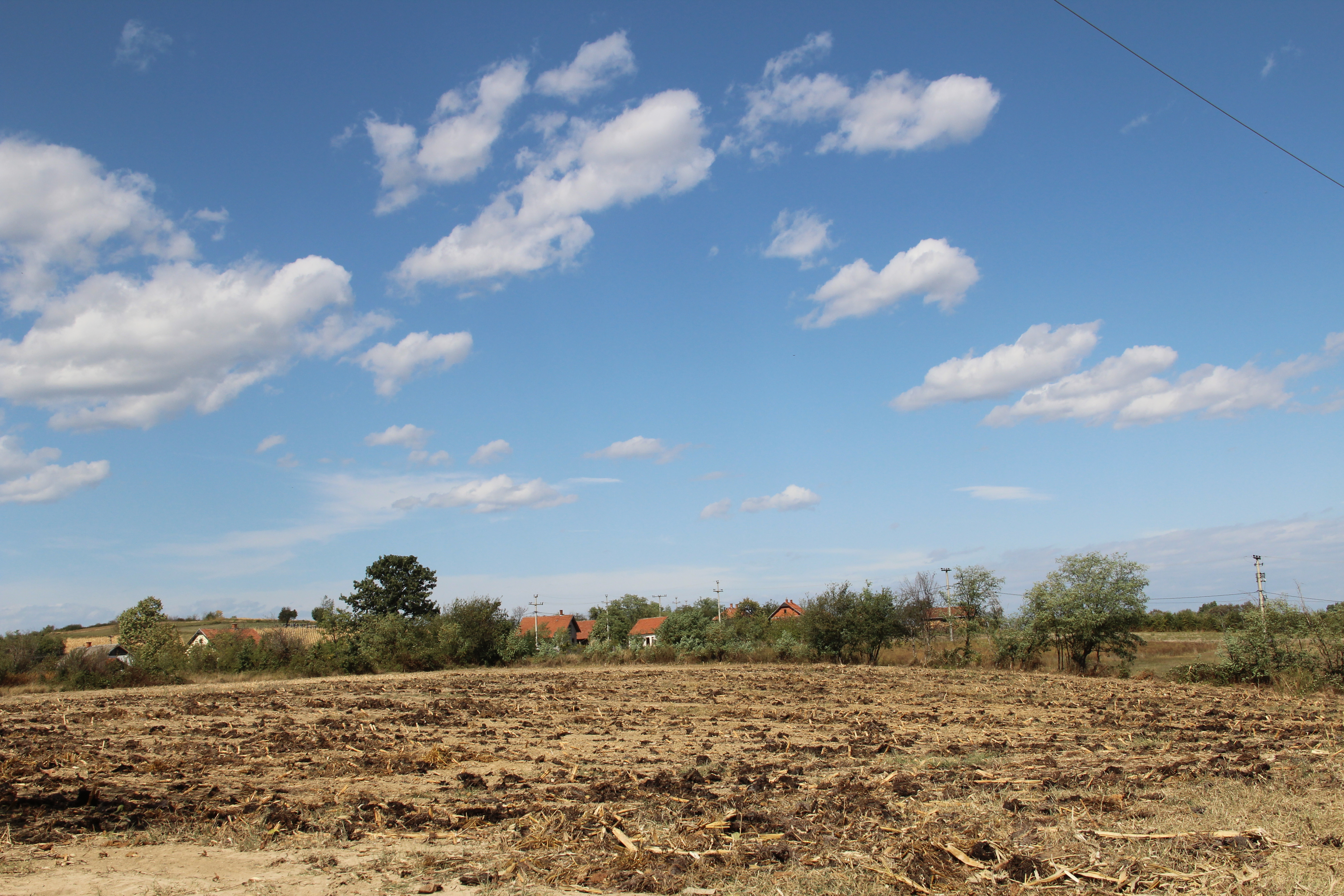
Babina Luka - Panorama

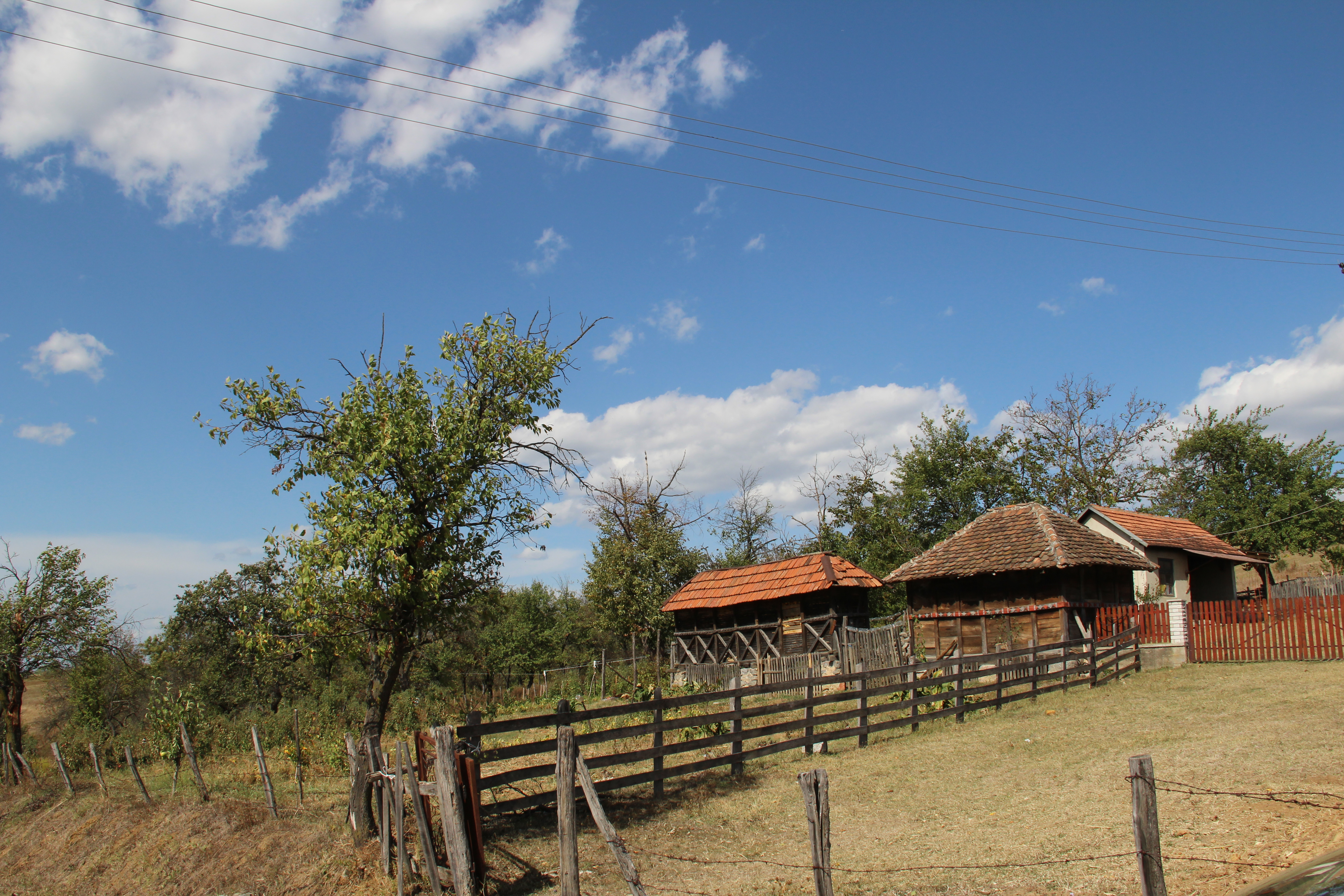
Babina Luka - Panorama

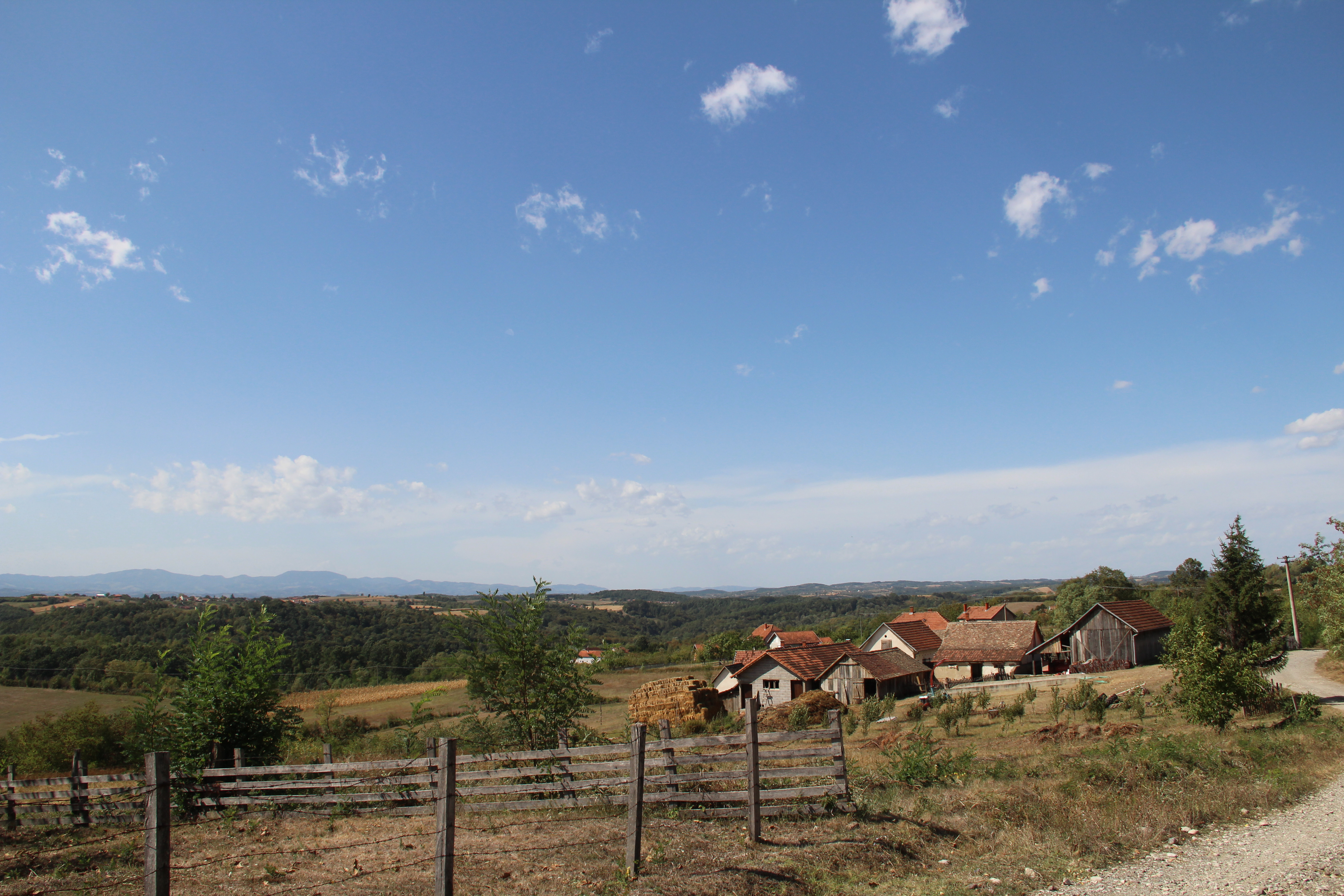
Babina Luka - Panorama

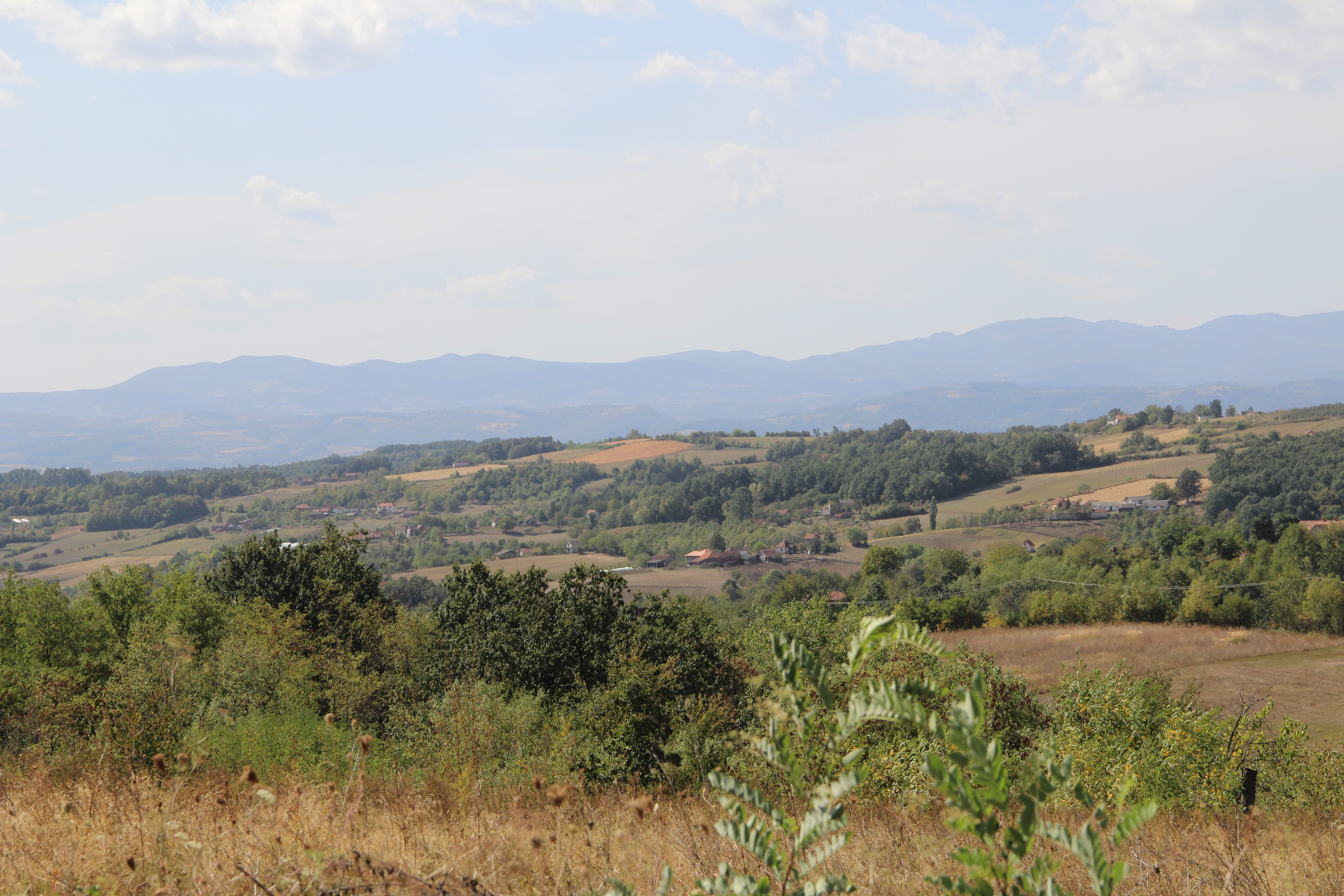
Babina Luka - Panorama

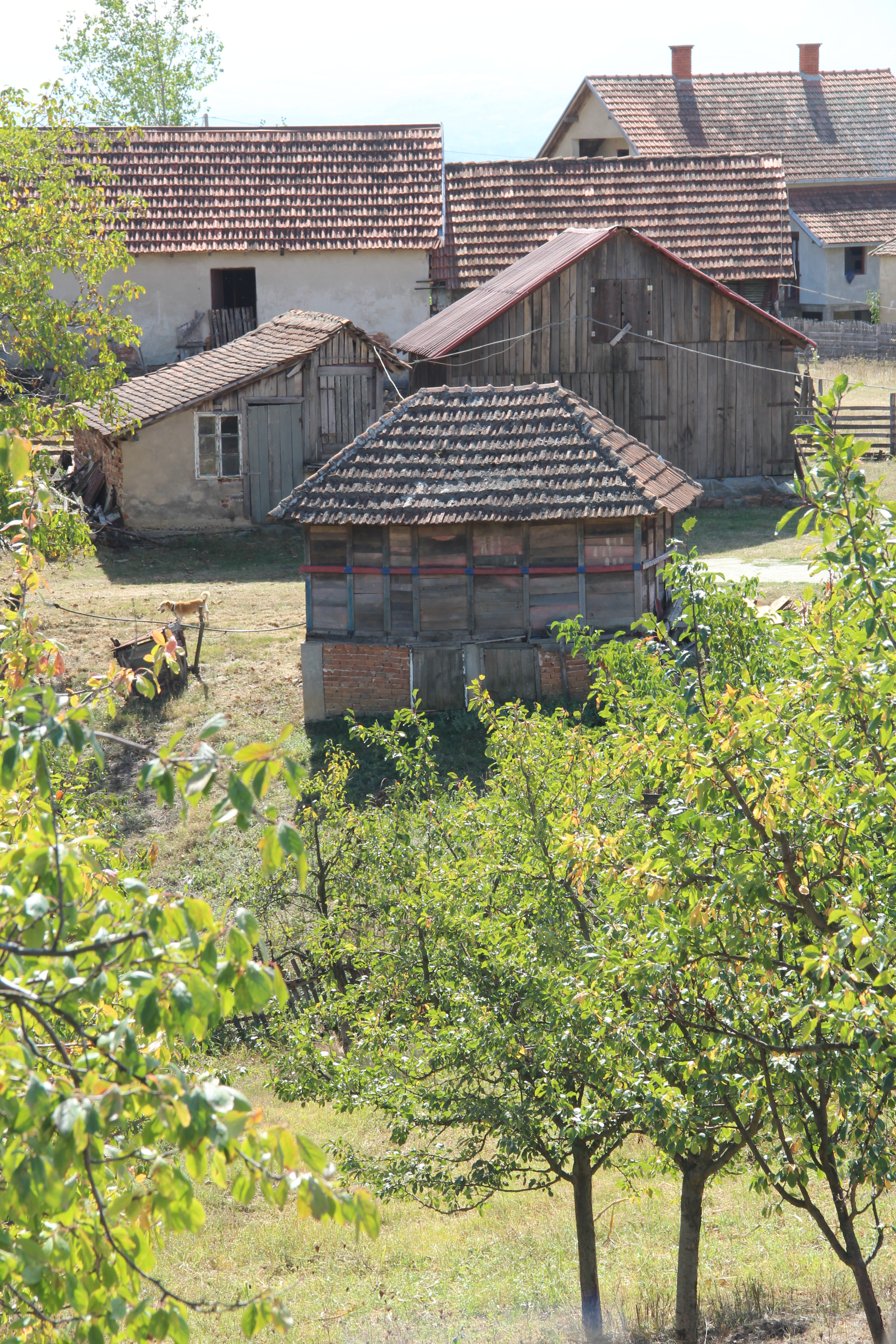
Babina Luka - Panorama

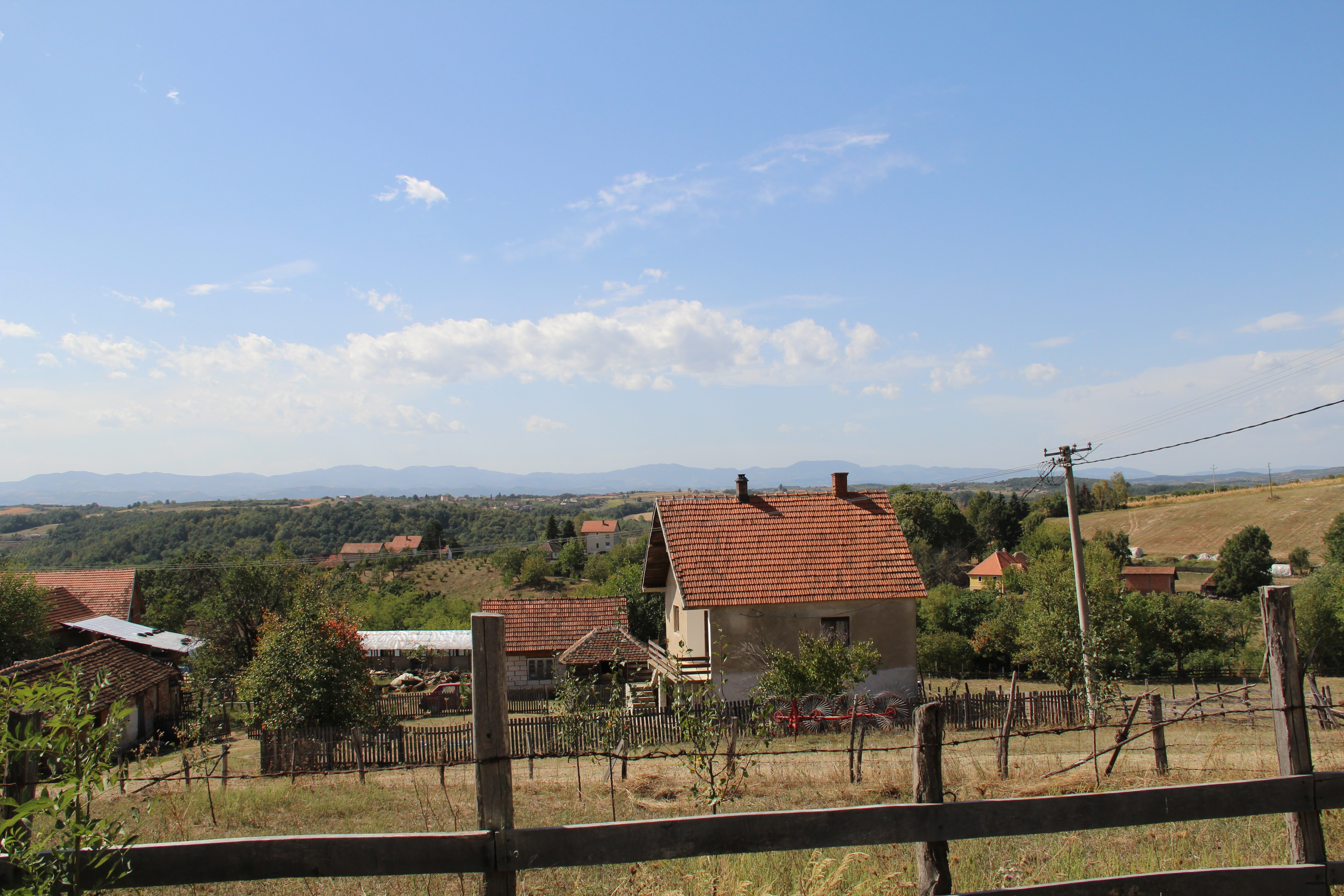
Babina Luka - Panorama

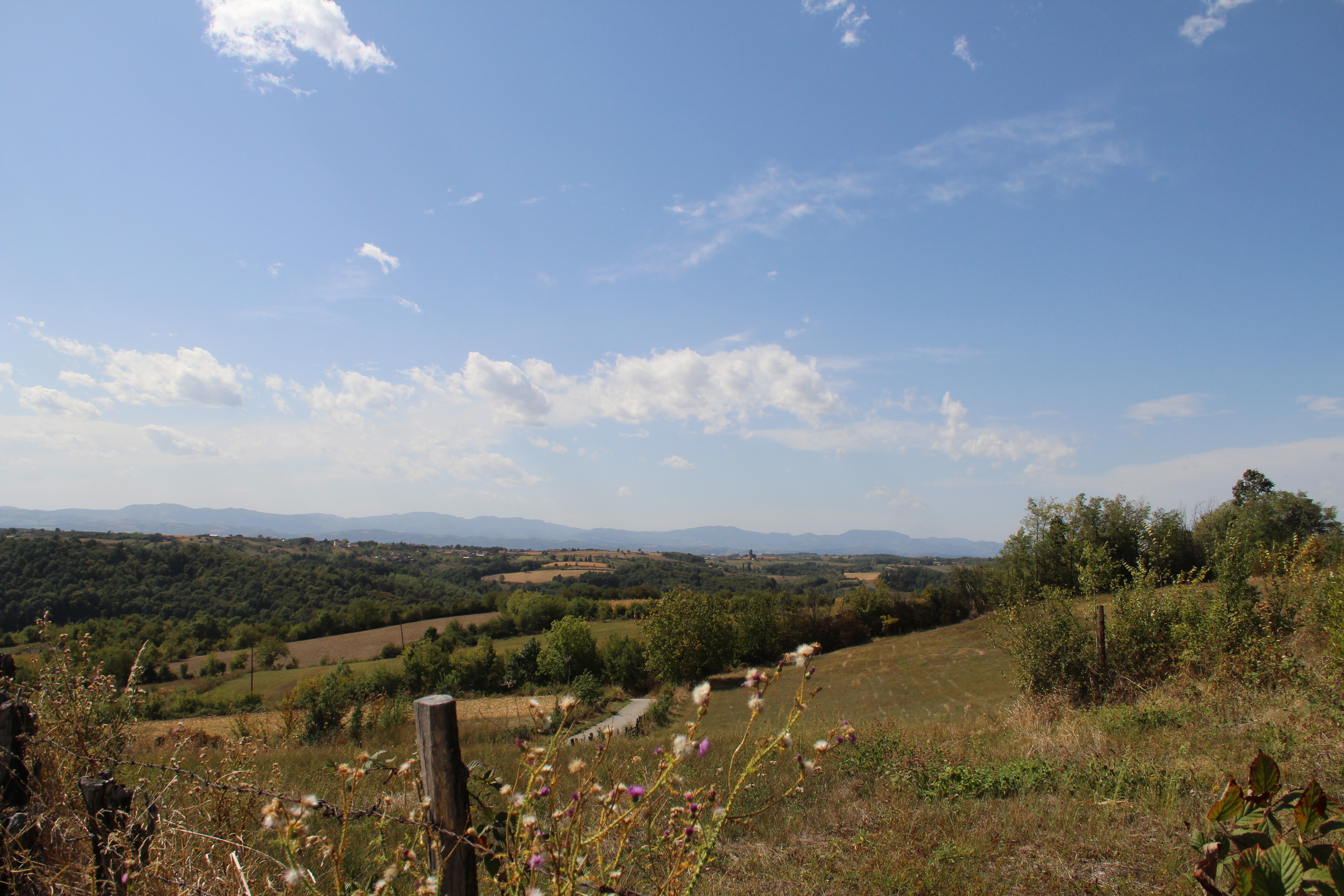
Babina Luka - Panorama

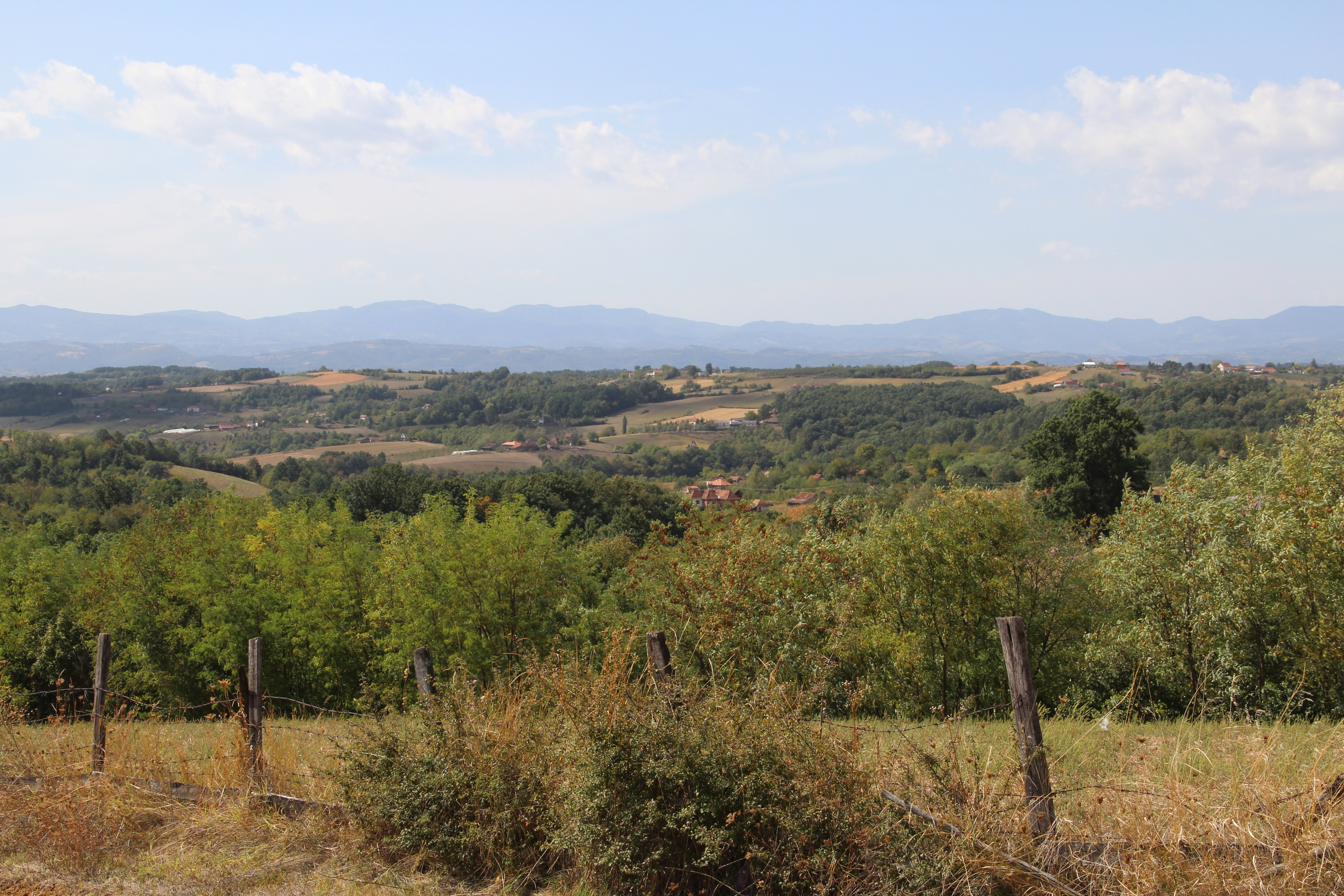
Babina Luka - Panorama

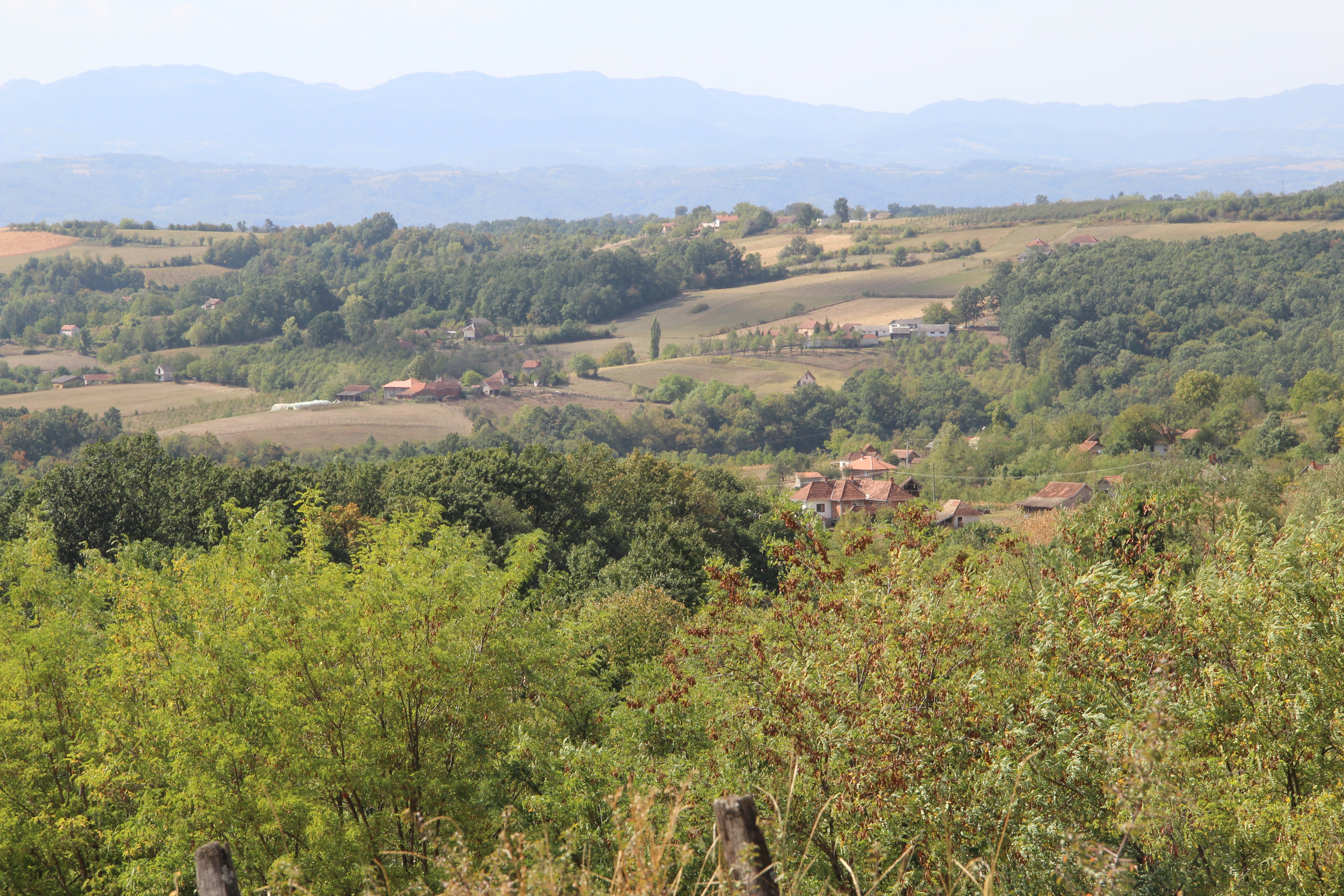
Babina Luka - Panorama

== Notable people ==
- Hadži-Ruvim
- Petar Nikolajević Moler
