= Hadži-Đera =

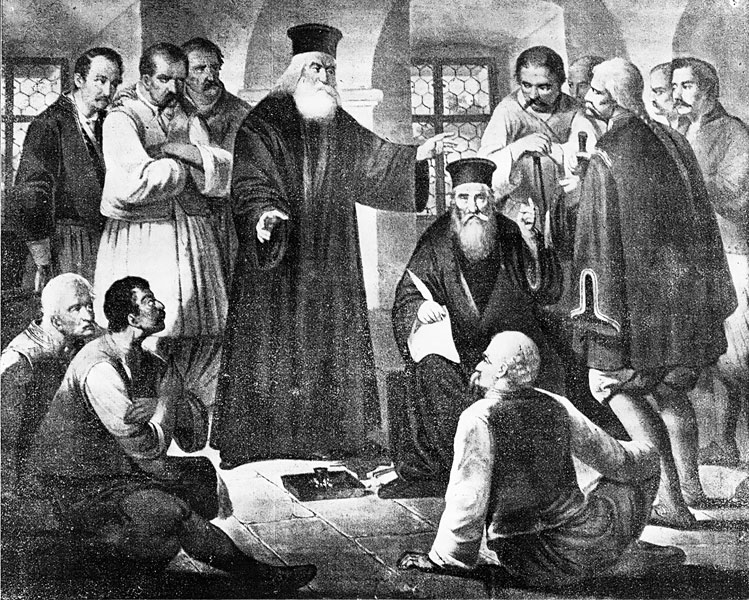
Hadži-Ðera (standing) and Hadži-Ruvim (sitting) with conspirators.

Gerasim Georgijević (Serbian Cyrillic: Герасим Георгијевић; fl. 1791–d. January 1804) or Đurđević (Ђурђевић), known as Hadži Gerasim (Хаџи Герасим) and Hadži-Đera (Хаџи-Ђера), was a Serbian Orthodox jeromonah (priest-monk) and the hegumen (monastery head) of the Monastery of Moravci near Ljig. He was killed during the weeks long "Slaughter of the Knezes" in 23–29 January 1804, along with other notable Serbs, after participating in a plot against the Dahije(renegade Janessaries).
