= Vladimir Krivošejev =

Vladimir Krivošejev (Serbian Cyrillic: Владимир Кривошејев; born 28 December 1963) is a Serbian historian, culturologist, museologist, director of the National Museum in Valjevo, and assistant professor at the Singidunum University.

He graduated in 1989, majoring in history at the Faculty of Philosophy, University of Belgrade, where he began graduate studies. He received a master's degree at the Faculty of Media and Culture, Megatrend University in marketing culture, and a doctorate from the Faculty of Dramatic Arts, University of Arts in Belgrade, at the Department of Management in culture, on topic of museum management.

In addition to museological activity, he is also involved in historiography and management culture. He is the author of several permanent exhibitions and thematic exhibitions, as well as dozens of bibliographic units (monographs, manuals, catalogs, guides, articles, discussions, presentations, etc.).
