= Population transfer in the Ottoman Empire =

Population transfer in the Ottoman Empire (Sürgün ) was a common policy used by the Ottoman government since the 14th century. After the Russo-Turkish War (1878), the importance of religious and ethnic identity increased leading to the 1913-1918 period when the primary aim of population transfers was the ethnic restructuring of Anatolia by the Turkish nationalist ruling elite. During this period, multiple ethnic minorities were moved around the empire; however, the treatment of Armenians stood out within the Ottoman Empire’s broader policies of population transfer because they were displaced more extensively and violently than any other group in what is widely considered to be genocide.

== History ==
The Ottoman Empire colonized newly conquered territories by deportation (sürgün) and resettlement, often to populate empty lands and establish settlements in logistically useful places. The term sürgün is known to us from Ottoman documents and comes from the verb sürmek (to displace). This type of resettlement primarily aimed to support daily governance of the Empire, but sometimes population transfers had ethnic or political concerns. Loyal Turkish and Muslim muhacir were resettled among populations considered to be hostile to the Empire, and Christians were intentionally displaced if they were considered a threat to the security of newly conquered territories.

=== Conquest ===
As the Ottoman Empire expanded, its government relocated people from Anatolia to the Balkans to strengthen their hold over new territories and also moved people from the conquered territory to Istanbul.

During Mehmet I's reign Tatar and Turkmen people were moved to the Balkans to secure areas along the border with Christian Europe. Conquered Christians were moved to Anatolia and Thrace. These population transfers continued into the reigns of Murad II and Mehmet II.

After Murad II's conquest of Salonika, Muslims were involuntarily relocated to Salonika, mostly from Anatolia and Yenice-i Vardar.

Mehmed the Conqueror resettled not only Muslims, but Christians and Jews, in his efforts to repopulate the city of Constantinople after its conquest in 1453.

According to the deportation decree issued in newly conquered Cyprus on 24 September 1572, one family out of every ten in the provinces of Anatolia, Rum (Sivas), Karaman and Zülkadriye were to be sent to Cyprus. These deportees were craftsmen or peasants. In exchange for relocating they would be exempt from taxes for two years.

=== Late Ottoman History ===
In the nineteenth century, Ottoman lands became a safe haven for Muslim refugees (muhacir) from the Caucasus and the Balkans.

The Ottomans had ruled the Balkans for nearly four centuries when their hegemony was challenged by Russia. By the early 19th century the first signs of declining Ottoman power could be seen in the independence struggles of the Serbian Revolution and the Greek Revolution of 1821. After Ottoman defeat in the Russo-Turkish War (1878) Ottoman influence greatly declined in the Balkans. In the aftermath of this calamity and the Balkan Wars of 1912–1913 over a million Muslims were displaced.

The first sanctioned population transfer took place in 1865, when about 40,000 Chechens, Kabardians, Ossetians, and other North Caucasian Muslims moved from Russia's Terek Oblast to the Ottoman Empire.

The newly created Balkan states were seeking to create ethnically homogeneous states; mutual population exchange agreements with the ruling Unity and Progress Party in Turkey were seen as the best tool for this demographic engineering. The ruling party in Turkey also used a combination of conscription and resettlement as part of their strategy, resettling the Muslim muhacir from the Balkans in border towns to increase the Muslim population in areas that had historic non-Muslim majorities.

The rise of competing nationalism between 1876 and 1926 set the stage for these population transfers. Ottoman xenophobia was fueled by deepening nationalist and anti-colonial sentiment in the early 20th century. The Ottoman literati resented the humiliating capitulations that impeded the empire's economic health. Separatist nationalist movements emerged from the non-Muslim communities of the Ottoman Empire who, as the main beneficiaries of the capitulations and constitutional reforms, faced hostility and resentment from the anti-imperialist factions.

During the First World War, many ethnic and religious groups—including Kurds, Greeks, Assyrians, Circassians, Albanians, and others—were displaced or subjected to violence. Armenians, however, were deported on an especially large scale and faced widespread killing during these deportations, making their treatment particularly severe compared with that of other groups.

== Sources ==
- Hamed-Troyansky, Vladimir (2024). Empire of Refugees: North Caucasian Muslims and the Late Ottoman State. Stanford, CA: Stanford University Press. ISBN 978-1-5036-3696-5.
