= Leontius, Metropolitan of Belgrade =

Leontius (Greek: Λεόντιος, Serbian: Leontije; fl. 1801–23) was the Metropolitan of Belgrade between 1801 and 1813, during the Serbian Revolution. An ethnic Greek from Adrianople, Leontius was a disciple of Methodius, the Metropolitan of Belgrade between 1791 and 1801. Methodius was murdered, and some believe that Leontius was involved. Some also believe that he was involved in the murder of Vizier Hadži Mustafa Pasha, which resulted in the Sanjak of Smederevo being ruled by the renegade Janissaries known as the Dahije. Leontius supported the Dahije, and had Serbian abbot Hadži-Ruvim captured by them upon hearing that a uprising was planned (see also Slaughter of the Knezes). After the Uprising against the Dahije broke out, Leontius worked to have the insurgents to give up and accept the Dahije. After having defeated the Dahije, the Serbian insurgents turned on the Ottomans. In 1810 Leontius and Russian agent Konstantin Rodofinikin plotted against Karađorđe. Leontius left Revolutionary Serbia in 1813.

== Annotations ==
Known as Leontije Lambrović (Леонтије Ламбровић) in Serbian.

Religious titles
Preceded by Methodius	Metropolitan of Belgrade; 1801–1813	Succeeded by Melentije Stevanović (acting), Dionysius II
