= Bogovađa =

Coordinates: 44°19′N 20°11′E

- Village (Selo)
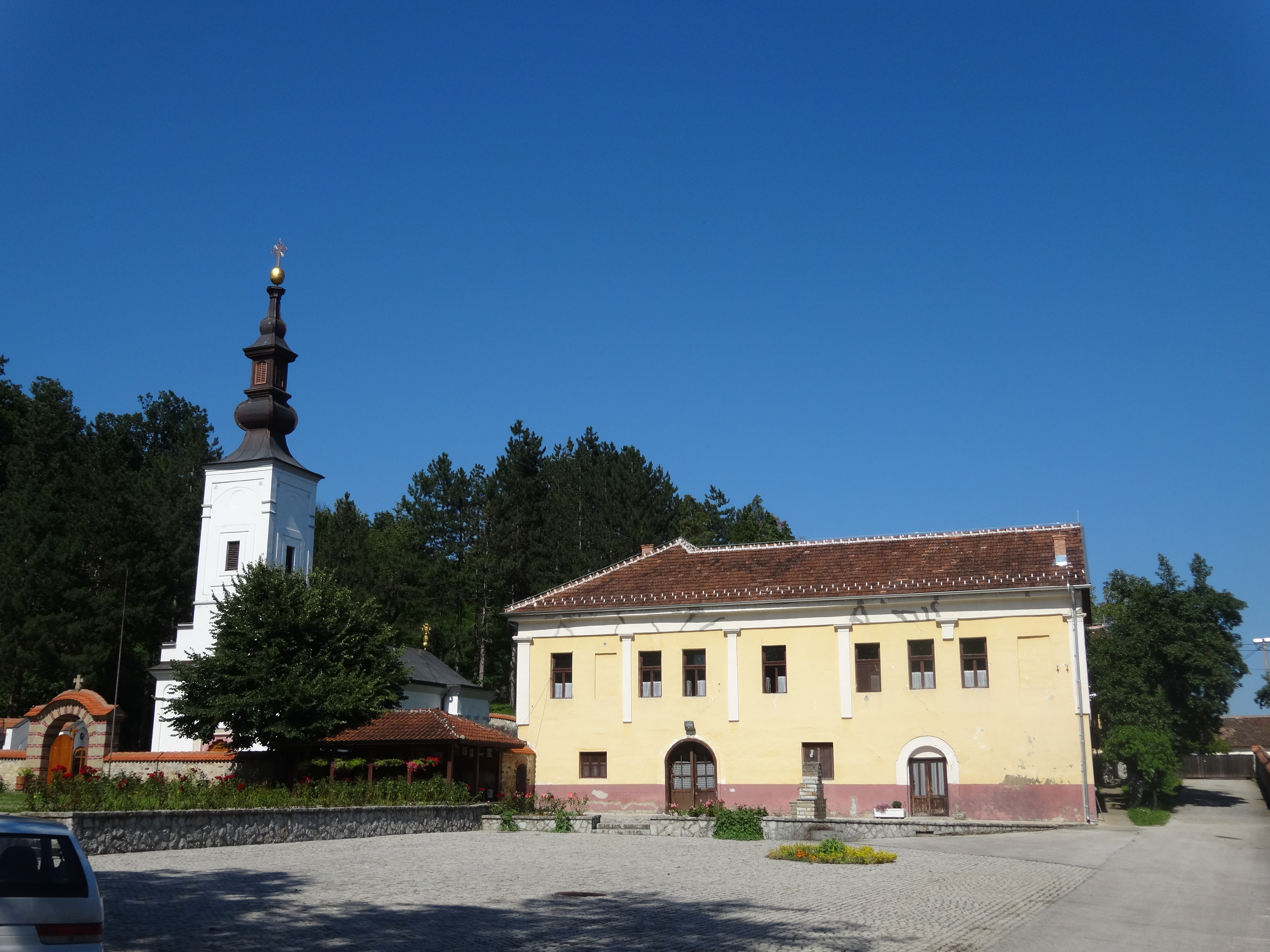
- Bogovađa monastery
- Interactive map of Bogovađa
- Country: Serbia
- District: Kolubara
- Municipality: Lajkovac
- Time zone: UTC+1 (CET)
  - Summer (DST): UTC+2 (CEST)

Bogovađa is a village situated in Lajkovac municipality, Kolubara District in Serbia.
