= Ilija Birčanin =

Serb knez and militia commander (1764–1804)

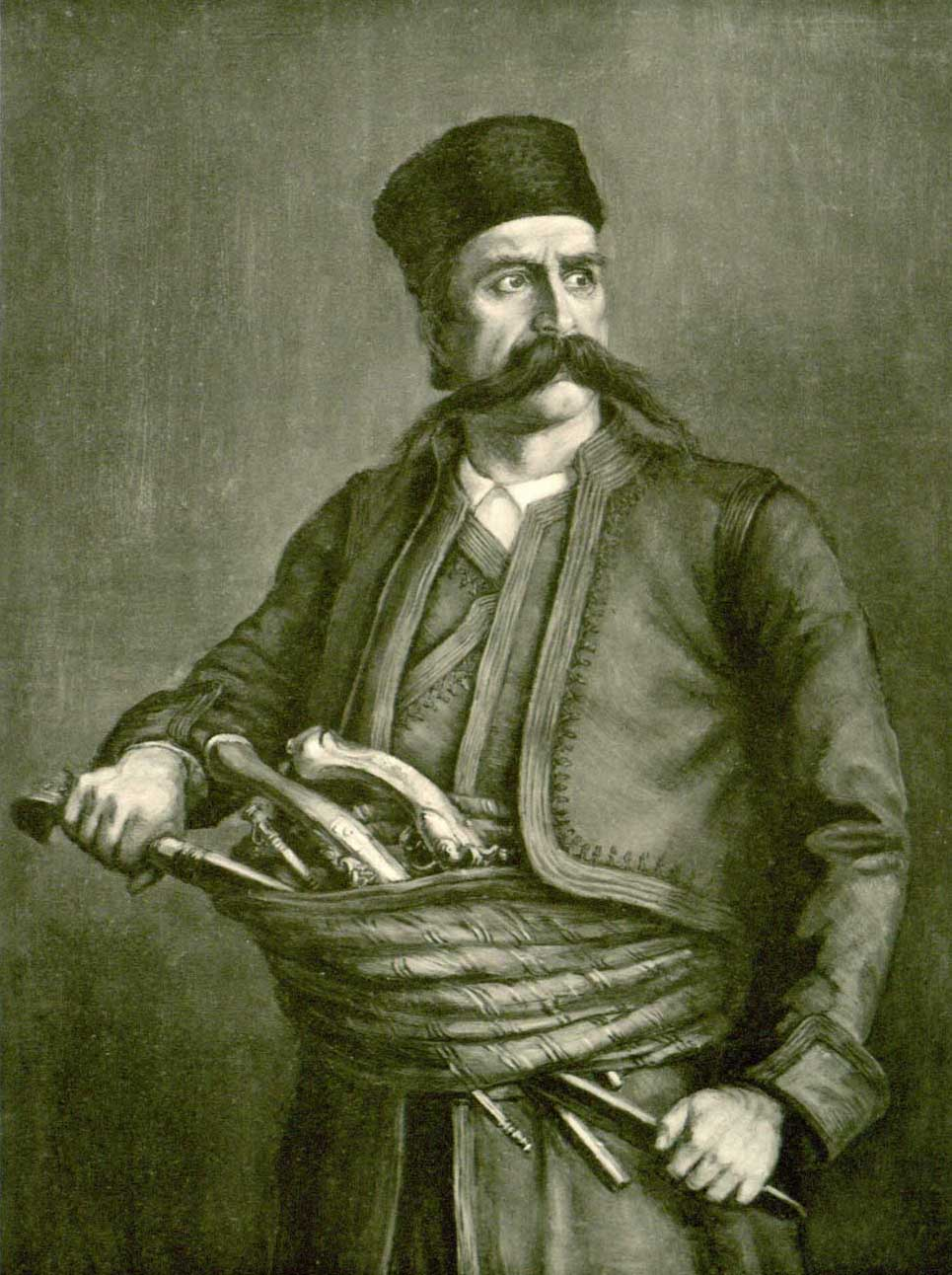
- Born: 12 August 1764; Suvodanje, Ottoman Empire
- Died: 4 February 1804 (aged 39); Valjevo, Ottoman Empire
- Cause of death: Execution by beheading
- Resting place: Ćelije Monastery
- Occupation: knez of Podgorje
- Known for: Serb rural leader in Valjevo nahiya; Serb militia member; victim in the Slaughter of the Knezes
- Movement: Serb conspiratory group in the Belgrade Pashalik
- Opponent: Dahije
- Family: Birčani (Nenadović clan)

Ilija Birčanin (Serbian Cyrillic: Илија Бирчанин; 12 August 1764 – 4 January 1804) was a Serb knez (village leader) and militia commander in the Valjevo area of western Serbia. He was killed during the Slaughter of the Knezes, which sparked the First Serbian Uprising of the Serbian Revolution, ultimately leading to Serbia's liberation from the Ottoman Empire.

== Early life ==
Birčanin was born in the village of Suvodanje below the Medvednik mountain, in the Valjevo nahiya. His family belonged to the Nenadović clan that settled from Birač (in Old Herzegovina). The Nenadović family in Brankovina, which included brothers Aleksa Nenadović and Jakov Nenadović, also belonged to this clan.

In the Memoirs of archpriest and vojvoda Matija Nenadović, there were no mentions of Birčanin having participated in the Austro-Turkish War (1788–1791) or being part of the Serbian Free Corps. The Valjevo nahiya was a site of operations in the war. The Porte gave amnesty to participants on the Austrian side and banned the problematic janissaries from the Belgrade Pashalik.

== Knez ==
Ilija Birčanin was the knez of the knežina (Christian self-governing village group) of Podgorje (or Podgorina) during the tenure of Vizier Hadji Mustafa Pasha, having succeeded Joka from Rabas as knez. He closely worked with knez of Brankovina Aleksa Nenadović and knez of Kolubara Nikola Grbović, holding assemblies where they discussed and decided on matters together, and collected the taxes from the villagers that the trio went to Belgrade with and handed over to the Vizier and later, the Dahije. The trio protected their villagers from Turk oppression and injustice.

== Hadji Mustafa Pasha and Janissaries ==
Hadji Mustafa Pasha became the Vizier of Belgrade (the Sanjak of Smederevo, known as the "Belgrade Pashalik") in July 1793. The renegade Janissaries from the Sanjak of Vidin under Osman Pazvantoglu sought to wrest the Belgrade Pashalik, and Mustafa Pasha thus decided to increase taxes to protect himself and the population. The Serb knez leaders met up with Mustafa Pasha in Belgrade and told him that the extraordinary taxes would be impossible to collect, as the people had nothing more to give. Mustafa Pasha explained the Janissary threat, and the knez leaders, among whom were Aleksa, Grbović and Birčanin, suggested that instead of taxes, the Serbs would offer him a Serbian militia to fight the Janissaries in case of an invasion. The pasha accepted, on the condition that each soldier was equipped with one musket, a yatagan, and two flintlocks, and that the militia be combat ready, awaiting his call to fight the Janissaries. Thus, in order to rid the threat of the janissaries, a "people's militia" of Serbs placed under Ottoman service was established, numbering some 15,000, many of whom had gained military training and experience in the last war. The top commander of the militia was Stanko Arambašić.

The Janissaries under the command of Tosun Agha (Serbian: Tosun-aga) entered the Belgrade Pashalik splitting up into two groups, one which took over Ćuprija in the southeast, the other which attacked Požarevac in the east, clashing with the militia under the direct command of Arambašić. The Janissaries defeated Arambašić and proceeded to Belgrade, where they took over the lower town (varoš). Vizier Mustafa Pasha closed himself and his small number of soldiers into the Belgrade Fortress. Aleksa, Grbović and Birčanin had gathered a force at Grabovac to the west of Belgrade when they heard of the Janissary invasion, and awaited for Mustafa Pasha's call. When they heard that the Janissaries had taken the lower town, and still had not heard from the pasha, the trio took a boat at Palež (now Obrenovac) on the Sava river to the Belgrade Fortress where they informed Mustafa Pasha of their readied force at Grabovac. Mustafa Pasha kept Aleksa while Grbović and Birčanin went to Grabovac and took their force on boats from Palež to Belgrade. The sipahi were put by the Vidin Gate, Mustafa Pasha's entourage by the Stambol Gate, the Valjevo force under Aleksa, Grbović and Birčanin went by the Sava to the Sava Gate, and they then simultaneously opened the gates and assaulted the Janissaries that had taken the lower town and successfully pushed them out of Belgrade, at the end of November 1797. Aleksa then stayed by the side of the Vizier with his troops to secure the city and town. Birčanin took his knežina troops and joined up with another militia under Karađorđe, who together pursued the Janissaries to Smederevo, in January 1798. The Janissaries closed themselves in the Smederevo Fortress, so Mustafa Pasha sent cannons with which Smederevo was bombarded, forcing the Janissaries to leave, and they were pursued all the way back to Vidin. Birčanin and his Podgorci participated in many battles with the Janissaries. As a reward for the aid, the Porte issued firmans (decrees) which forbade violence against Christians, gave Serbs self-governing privileges, better socio-economic status, allowed for them to build churches and their rural chiefs (titled knez) to retain security forces.

This state did not last long, as new conflicts with janissaries arose and the threat of the French in Egypt made the Porte allow for the return of the janissaries to the Pashalik in early 1799. Upon their return, the janissaries renewed terror against the Serbs, captured Belgrade and Mustafa Pasha in July 1801, murdered him in December, then ruled the Pashalik with a Vizier as their puppet. The Janissaries had plotted with the Vidin Pashalik. The leading janissaries, called the Dahije, abolished the Serbs' firmans, banished unsupportive sipahi and invited Muslims from nearby sanjaks which they used to control the Serbs.

Oppression and tyranny continued. Aleksa, Grbović and Birčanin with other knezes secretly met at the Čokešina Monastery where they wrote an appeal to the Sultan regarding the Janissaries, and sent it via Austria to the Porte. The Dahije were then threatened by the Porte that a great army would be sent if they did not end with oppressing the rayah. The banished sipahi and loyal Muslims organized a rebellion against the janissaries with the support of the Serbs in mid-1802, but it failed, resulting in further oppression.

== Slaughter of the Knezes ==
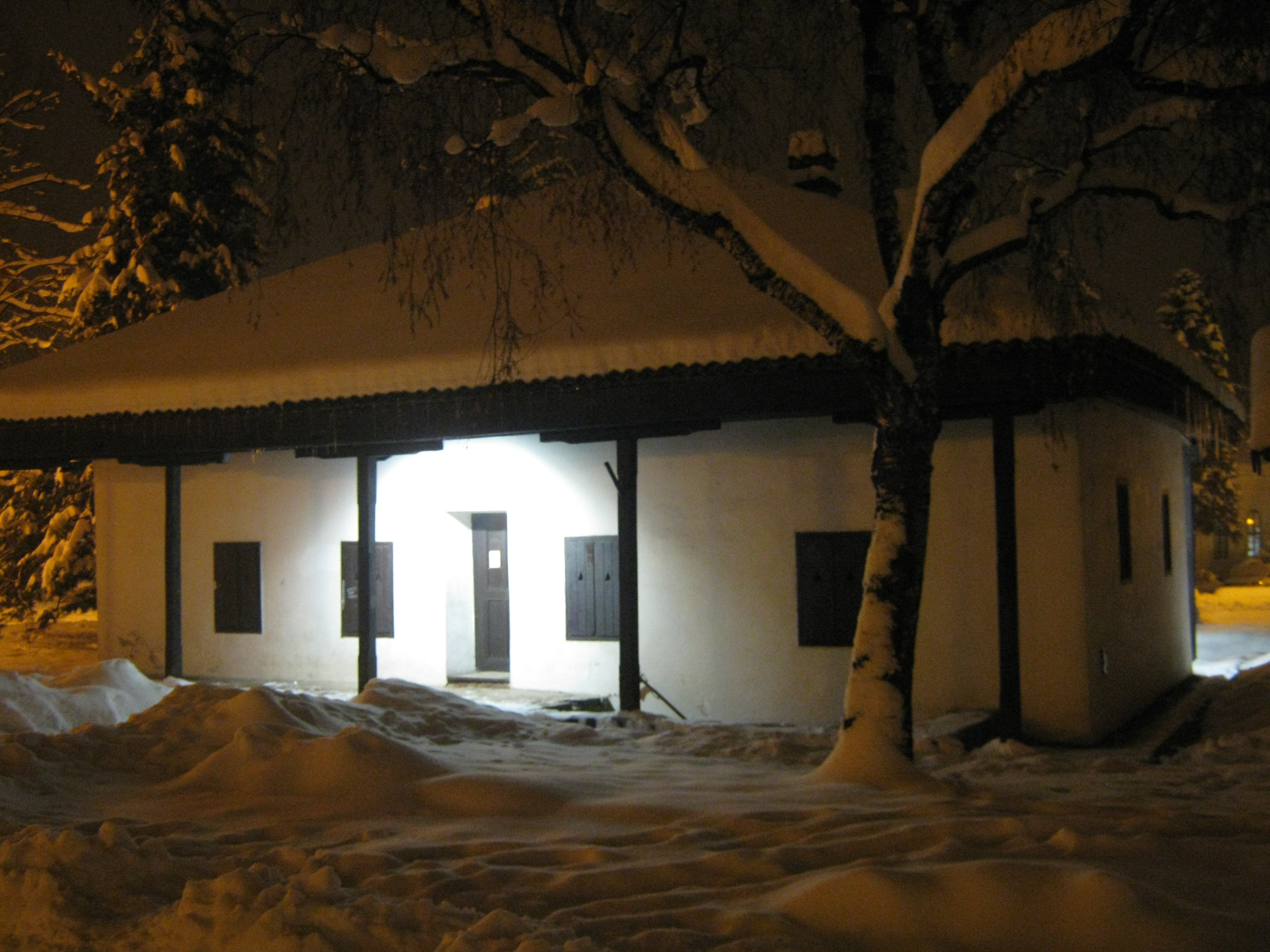
Muselimov konak, where Aleksa and Birčanin were held in chains.

Aleksa had written a letter to Austrian officer Paul von Mitesser in Zemun regarding plans for an uprising against the Dahije, which they however intercepted. The Dahije now ordered their mütesellim to murder chosen notable Serbs on a coming specific date. Dahije leader Mehmed-aga Fočić sent for Aleksa, Birčanin and Nikola Grbović to ready lodging and food for the hunt of his 200 men in Valjevo and Šabac. Birčanin's momak ("lad") Milić Kedić suggested that he take an entourage with him but he declined, as it would show Fočić that he did not trust him. After being the stari svat (second best man) at a wedding in Rabas he went to Sedlar and then headed to Valjevo. Aleksa, Birčanin and Nikola Grbović's son Milovan met up with Fočić at the Lubenica field and then turned to Valjevo, where they were captured and put in heavy chains in the dungeon. Upon hearing this, Aleksa's brother Jakov Nenadović gathered some serfs and Živko Dabić to meet with the elder Turks of Valjevo, who respected Aleksa and Birčanin, and negotiate with Fočić about their release. Fočić demanded payment for their "not receiving him well, not readying lodging", which Jakov gathered some and loaned the rest from the Valjevo Turks. The Turks were informed that Fočić would steal the payment and kill all chiefs so they told Jakov that they would have the payment ready the next day. The Nenadović family gathered all their belongings to give to Fočić so that he wouldn't change his mind that night about releasing them. The next day Milovan Grbović was released and Aleksa Nenadović and Ilija Birčanin brought to execution. Aleksa turned to speak to the gathered people but was interrupted by Fočić who ordered the executioner to cut, first Ilija, and then Aleksa, who survived the first dull blow. Fočić put the severed heads on display at his house.

After three days and begging of Valjevans, the bodies were collected. Milić Kedić took the body to be buried at the Ćelije Monastery, where a white marble tombstone was erected. The Dahije killed many notable Serbs in the event known as the "Slaughter of the Knezes", which helped trigger the First Serbian Uprising.

Birčanin was tall, with a bony strong body, long cheeks, dark complexion with a thick large moustache, very sharp look and a loud voice. He was cool, smart and courageous, known for being a very good rider and skilled in rifle shooting, and wore nice clothes. He was armed with a mace. He hated Turks, and the Dahije reportedly feared him.

Milić Kedić succeeded him as knez after Birčanin's brother declined.

== Legacy ==
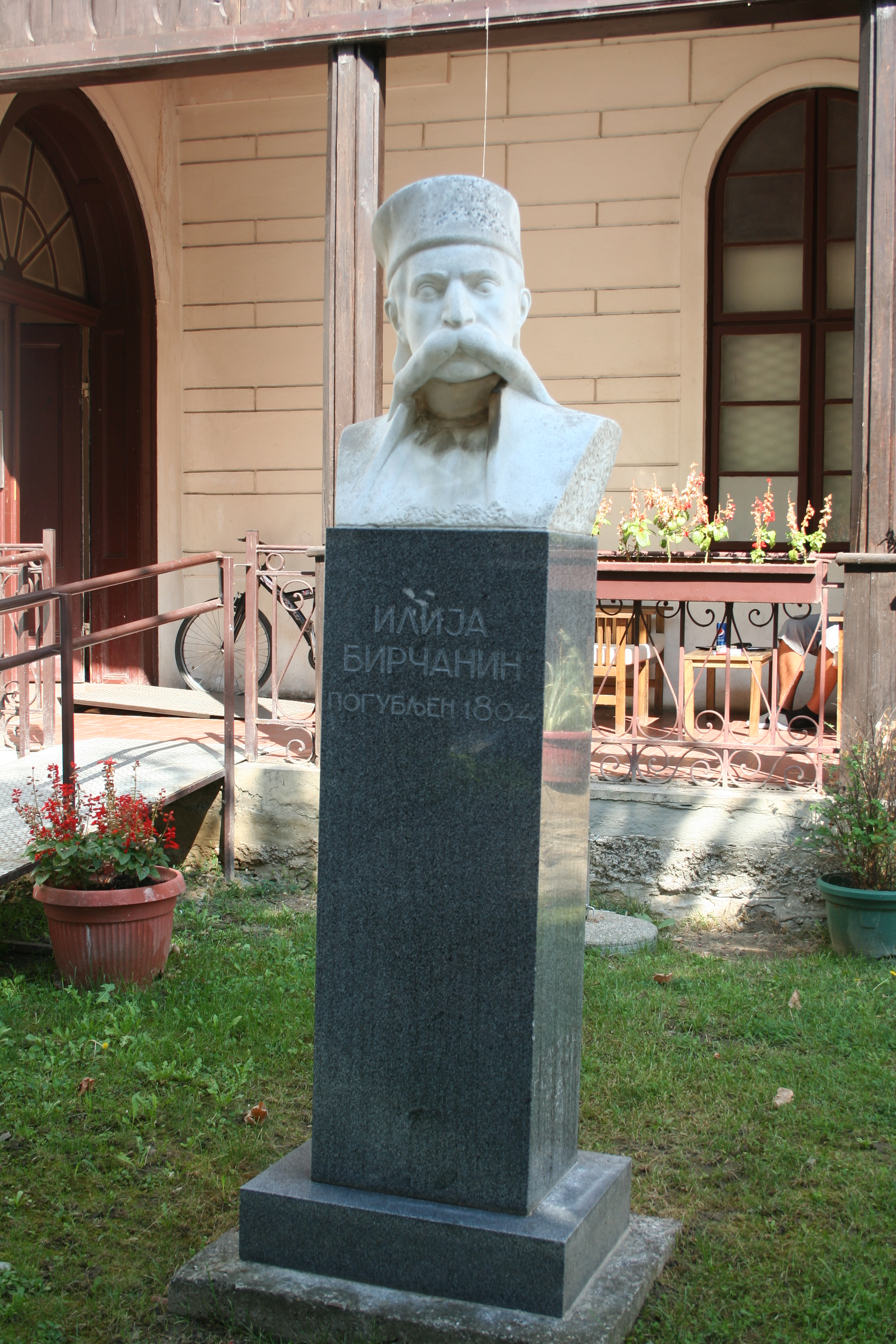
Bust of Ilija Birčanin outside the Museum of Valjevo.

Ilija Birčanin is known from the epic poem Beginning of the Uprising against the Dahije (Почетак буне против дахија) in which Dahije leader Mehmed-aga Fočić is particularly glad that Ilija Birčanin who "wore his moustache under his hat" and acted as "he was the pasha, and I the soubashi", would be killed in the coming Slaughter of the Knezes.

Joksim Nović-Otočanin (1807–1868) wrote an epic poem of 3,082 verses about him (1862). In 1951, the house of the mutesellim (muselimov konak) in Valjevo, where they were held before execution, was made into a "people's museum".

The Serbian Chetnik Ilija Trifunović (1877–1943) took Birčanin as his nom de guerre.

A school in Zemun was named after him. A bust was placed by the entrance of the Museum of Valjevo.

== See also ==
- List of Serbian Revolutionaries

== Sources ==
- Batalaka, Lazar Arsenijević (1898). Историја српског устанка. Vol. I. Izd. Batalakinoga fonda.
- Filipović, Stanoje R. (1982). Podrinsko-kolubarski region. RNIRO "Glas Podrinja". p. 60.
- Krivošejev, Vladimir (2017). ""Данас је вашар у Ваљеву и посета је музеју била обимна"". Godišnjak za društvenu istoriju. XXIV (1). Udruženje za društvenu istoriju: 69–82. ISSN 0354-5318 – via CEEOL.
- Milićević, Milan Đ. (1888). Поменик знаменитих људи у српског народа новијега доба. Издање Чупићеве задужбине – via Archive.org.
- Nedeljković, Slaviša D.; Đorđević, Miloš Z. (2015). "Политичке прилике у београдском пашалуку у предвечерје српске револуције (1787-1804)". Teme. XXXIX (3). Niš: 965–969.
- Nenadović, Konstantin N. (1884). Живот и дела великог Ђорђа Петровића Кара-Ђорђа. Vol. II (1 ed.). Vienna: У Штампарији Јована Н. Вернаја. pp. 291–298 – via Google Books.
- Nenadović, Konstantin N. (1903) [1883]. Живот и дела великог Ђорђа Петровића Кара-Ђорђа. Vol. I (2 ed.). Belgrade: Штампа Савића и Комп. pp. 626–630.
- Nikolić, Rista (1898). "Илија Бирчанин". Kratka istorija onoga dela srpskoga naroda koji je živeo u Lazarevoj državi od 1459. do 1804. god. Štamparija P.K. Tanaskovića. pp. 16–19.
