= Simbargaon (Jainari) =

Village in Assam, India

- Village
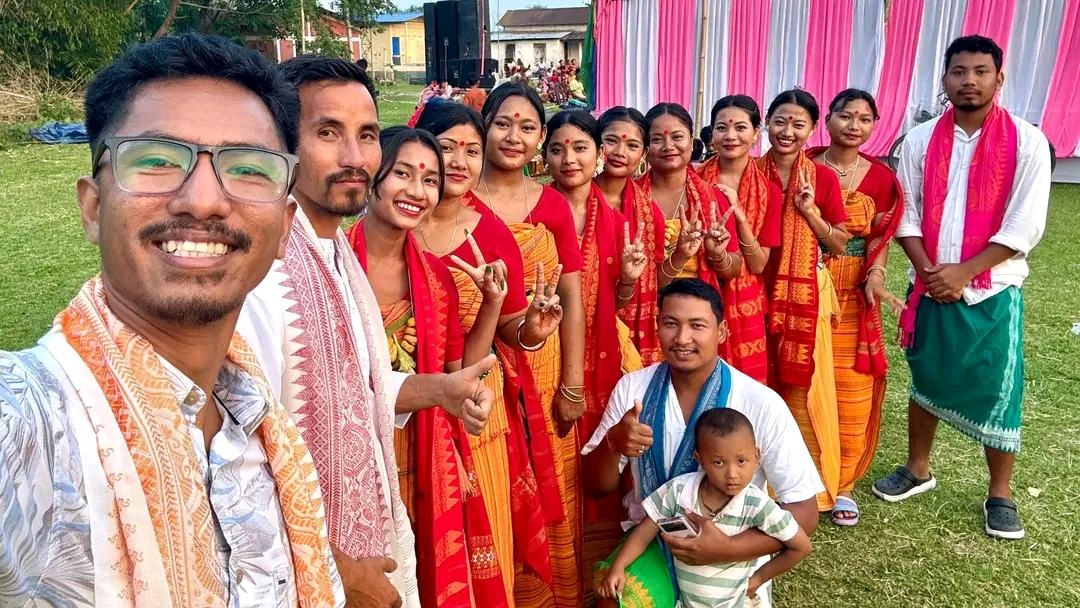
- Bihu celebration in Simbargaon (Jainari)
- Country: India
- State: Assam
- District: Kokrajhar (BTR)

Government
  - Type: SIMBARGAON VCDC
  - Body: (Kokrajhar East Assembly constituency)

Area
  - Total: 297 km^{2} (115 sq mi)

Population (As 2011 census)
  - Total: 640
- Demonym: Boro-Rabas

Languages
  - Official: Boro-Assamese-Bengali
- Time zone: UTC+5:30 (IST)
- Postal code: 783370
- ISO 3166 code: IN-AS-16

Simbargon (Jainari) is a village located in Kokrajhar subdivision of Kokrajhar district in the Indian state of Assam. It sits 19km from Kokrajhar Town.

== Demographics ==
Simbargaon village has a population of 640 of which 317 are males while 323 are females as per the Population Census 2011.

Children aged 0-6 number 57, or 8.91 % of the total. The average sex ratio is 1019, greater than Assam's state average of 958. The child sex ratiois 1036, higher than Assam's average of 962.

In 2011, the literacy rate was 82.16 % compared to 72.19 % of Assam. Male literacy stands at 89.62 %, while the female literacy rate was 74.83 %.

Scheduled tribes (ST) make up 95.16 % of the population. No members of Schedule Castes (SC) live in Simbargaon village.

== Administration ==
As per the constitution of India and the Panchyati Raaj Act, Simbargaon village is administrated by a Sarpanch (Head of Village), who is an elected representative.

== Economy ==
228 were occupied in work activities. 89.47 % of workers describe their work as main work (employment or earning more than 6 months) while 10.53 % were involved in marginal activity offering livelihood for under 6 months. Of 228 workers engaged in main work, 107 were cultivators (owner or co-owner) while 11 were agricultural laborers.

== Educational institutions ==
- Jainary ME & High School
- Simbargaon High School
- Mainao Swrnag Foaisali
