= Beheading in the Ottoman Empire =

Executing the death penalty under classical Islamic law

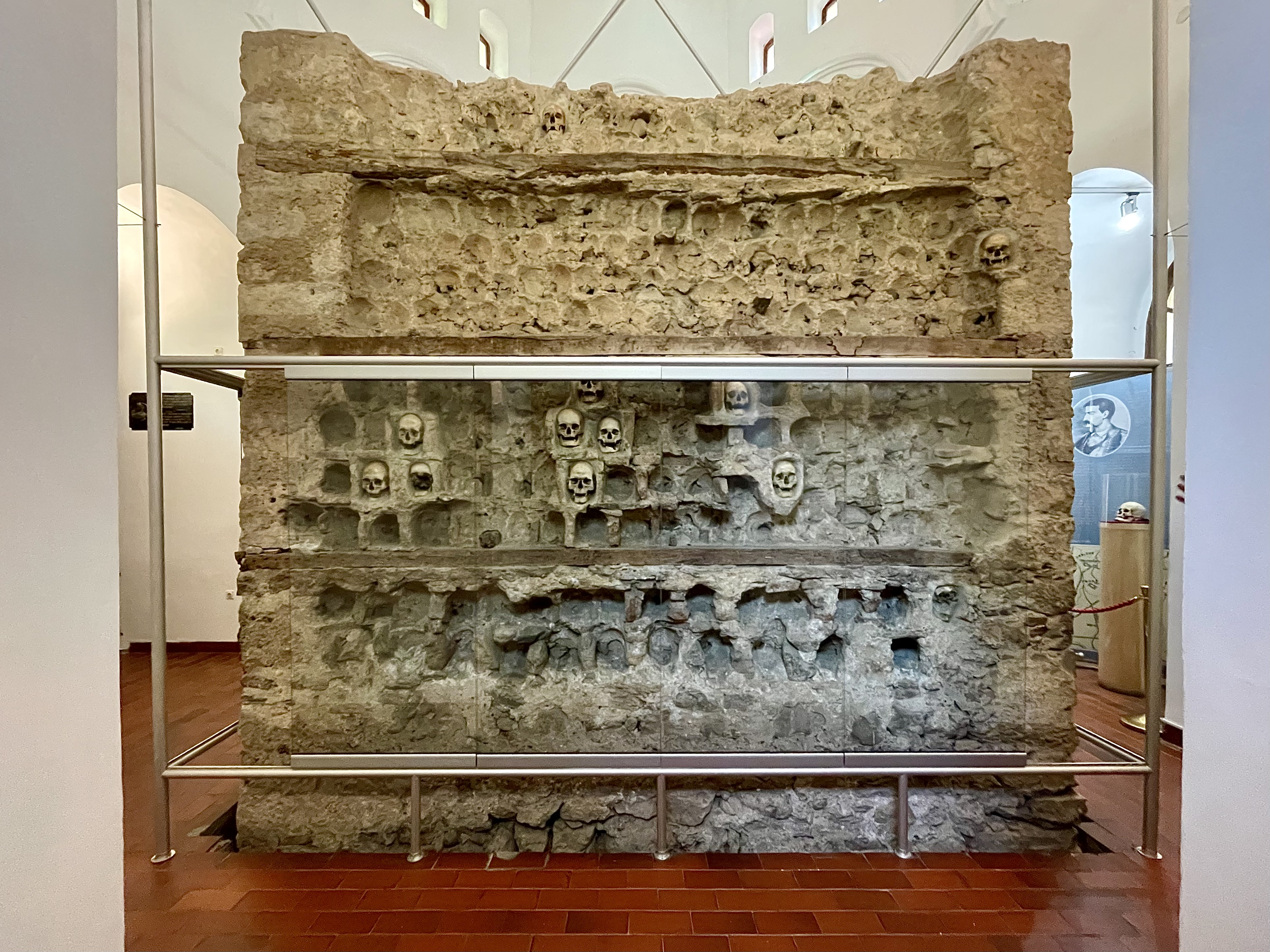
The Skull Tower which had 952 skulls of rebels that fell at the Battle of Čegar (1809).

Decapitation was the normal method of executing the death penalty under classical Islamic law. It was also, together with hanging, one of the ordinary methods of execution in the Ottoman Empire.

A Turkish chronicler said regarding the Battle of Kosovo (1389) that the field was "like a tulip bed, with its ruddy severed heads and rolling turbans". The imagery of victory and submission in Ottoman miniatures included "trophy heads"; in one such miniature, Ottoman commanders bring severed heads as tribute and recognition to Grand Vizier Sokollu Mehmed Pasha during the Habsburg–Ottoman war (1565–68), with the secretary of protocol counting the trophies. In a similar miniature dating to 1532 the secretary of protocol likewise counts the heads spread in the foreground of Vizier Kara Ahmed Pasha.

Following battles and rebellions, the Ottoman authorities would often order the beheading of captured enemy leaders. The Bâb-ı Hümâyûn (Imperial Gate) outside the Topkapı Palace (also known as Seraglio) was a place where heads of Serbian and Greek rebels were piled up as war trophies. The Ottoman Empire was known to create tower structures from the skulls of rebel fighters in order to elicit terror among its opponents. Two such examples are the Skull Tower in Serbia (image to the right) and the Burj al-Rus in Tunisia.

== Notable people ==
- Lazar of Serbia (1329–1389), Prince of Serbia, captured during battle and executed, according to some views at the place of Pirinaz Mosque.
- Władysław III of Poland (1424–1444), King of Poland, killed during battle and then beheaded.
- Stephen Tomašević (1438–1463), King of Bosnia, captured and executed by Sultan Mehmed II.
- Yunus Pasha (d. 1517), Grand Vizier, executed by order of Sultan Selim I.
- Hain Ahmed Pasha (d. 1524), Ottoman renegade pasha, executed due to treason.
- Marco Antonio Bragadin and Astorre Baglioni (d. 1571), condottieri, executed by Lala Mustafa Pasha.
- Ali Janbulad (d. 1610), Ottoman Kurdish renegade pasha, executed due to treason, head put on display in Constantinople.
- Ahmet the Calligrapher (d. 1682), Ottoman convert to Christianity, executed after refusing to return to Islam.
- Bajo Pivljanin (1630–1685), Serb hajduk, head put on display with several other at entrance of Seraglio.
- Gomidas Keumurdjian (1656–1707), Armenian Catholic priest, executed after refusing to convert.
- Constantin Brâncoveanu (1654–1714), Prince of Wallachia, executed by order of Sultan Ahmed III after refusing to convert.
- Saint Christos the Arvanid (d. 1748), Albanian civilian, executed after refusing to convert.
- Nicholas Mavrogenes (1735–1790), Prince of Wallachia, killed, head put on display in Constantinople.
- Hadji Ali Haseki (d. 1795), Ottoman official, executed, head put on display in front of Topkapı.
- Constantine Hangerli (1760–1799), Prince of Wallachia, head put on display in his palace.
- At least 72 heads of Serb notables in the "Slaughter of the Knezes" (Late December–4 February 1804), among whom were Janko Gagić, Aleksa Nenadović and Ilija Birčanin, the latter two's heads were put on display at Mehmed-aga Fočić's house.
- Stevan Sinđelić (1771–1809), Serbian rebel commander, head put on display at the Skull Tower.
- Sotirakis Londos (d. 1812), Greek notable, executed by order of the governor of Morea Eyalet.
- Stanoje Glavaš (1763–1815), Serbian rebel commander, head put on display at Kalemegdan.
- Selim Khimshiashvili (1755–1815), Ottoman beylerbey, executed by order of Sultan Mahmud II due to treason.
- Karađorđe (1768–1817), Serbian rebel leader, head decapitated after death, sent to Vizier Marashli Ali Pasha and then to the sultan, impaled on a stake and left on public display for a week at Constantinople.
- Abdullah bin Saud Al Saud (d. 1819), Saudi emir, executed by order of Sultan Mahmud II due to crimes against Islam.

== Sources ==
- Birchwood, Matthew; Dimmock, Matthew (2005). Cultural Encounters Between East and West, 1453-1699. Cambridge Scholars Press. ISBN 978-1-904303-41-1.
- Lane-Poole, Stanley (1888). Turkey. G.P. Putnam's sons.
- Peters, Rudolph (2006). Crime and Punishment in Islamic Law: Theory and Practice from the Sixteenth to the Twenty-First Century. Cambridge University Press.
- Quigley, Christine (2001). Skulls and Skeletons: Human Bone Collections and Accumulations. Jefferson, North Carolina: McFarland. ISBN 978-0-7864-1068-2.
