= Pirinaz Mosque =

Historic mosque in Kosovo

- Albanian: Xhamia e Pirinazit
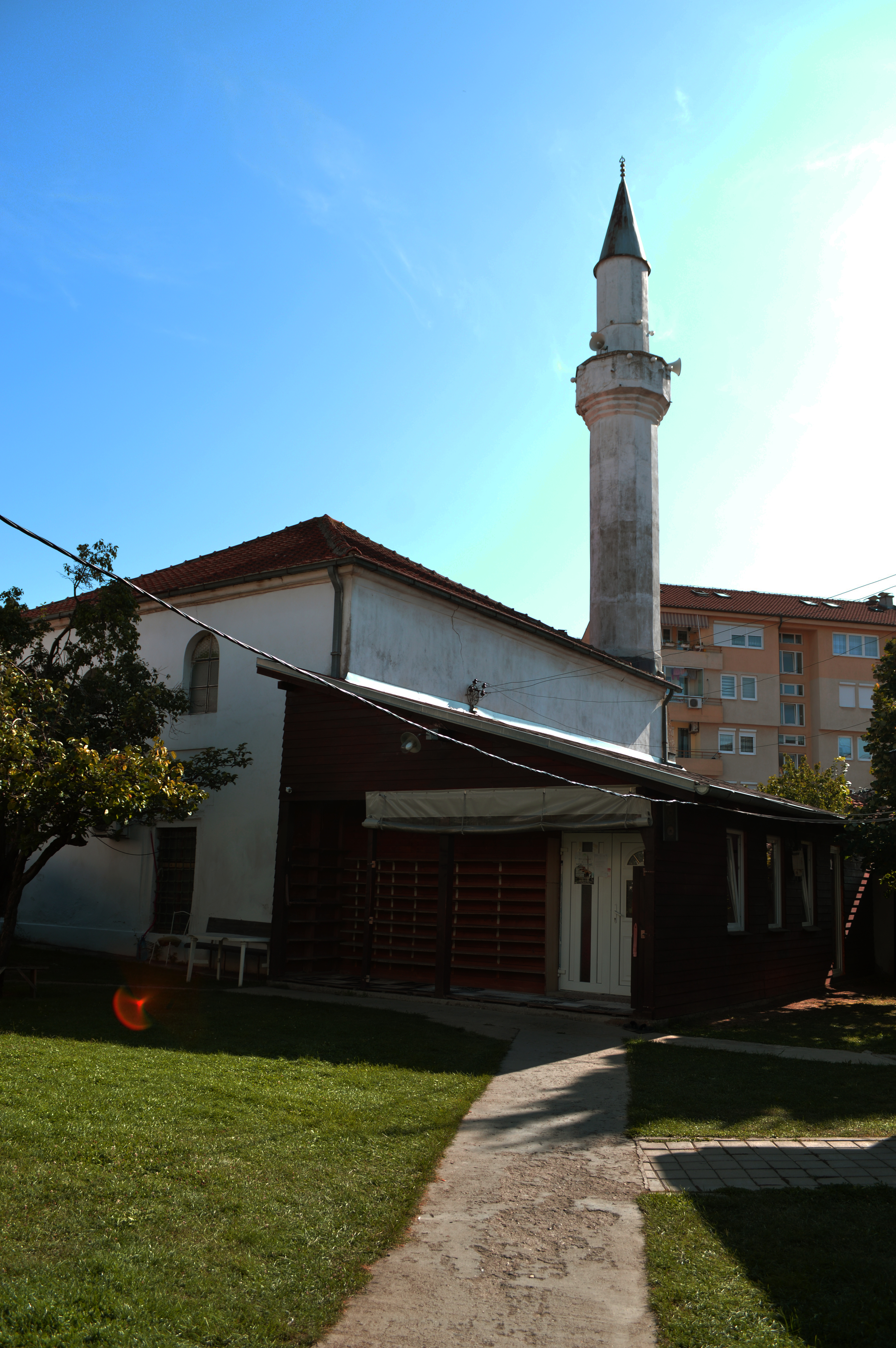

Religion
- Affiliation: Sunni Islam

Location
- Location: Pristina, Kosovo
- Interactive map of Pirinaz Mosque

Architecture
- Type: Mosque
- Style: Ottoman
- Completed: 16th century

The Pirinaz Mosque (Albanian: Xhamia e Pirinazit) is a mosque located in Pristina, Kosovo. It was built in the second half of the 16th century and was founded by Piri Nazir who served as Vezir under two Ottoman Sultans. The Pirinaz Mosque is made of the same stone as the Imperial Mosque but its construction began 100 years later. This mosque represents an important cultural value, which is further increased by the belief that Prince Lazar's remains were buried on the location of today's Pirinaz Mosque with the permission of Sultan Bayezid, son and successor of Murat, who died in the Battle of Kosovo in 1389. Later on, Lazar's remains were moved to Ravanica Monastery in Serbia. Furthermore, the local legend has it that "Stone of Lazar" located in the garden of Pirinaz Mosque was used to behead Prince Lazar. However, the real circumstances encompassing Lazar's death, remain unknown.

== Restoration ==
The Pirinaz Mosque underwent renovations between 2020 and early 2024, whereby both the interior and the exterior of the building were refurbished.

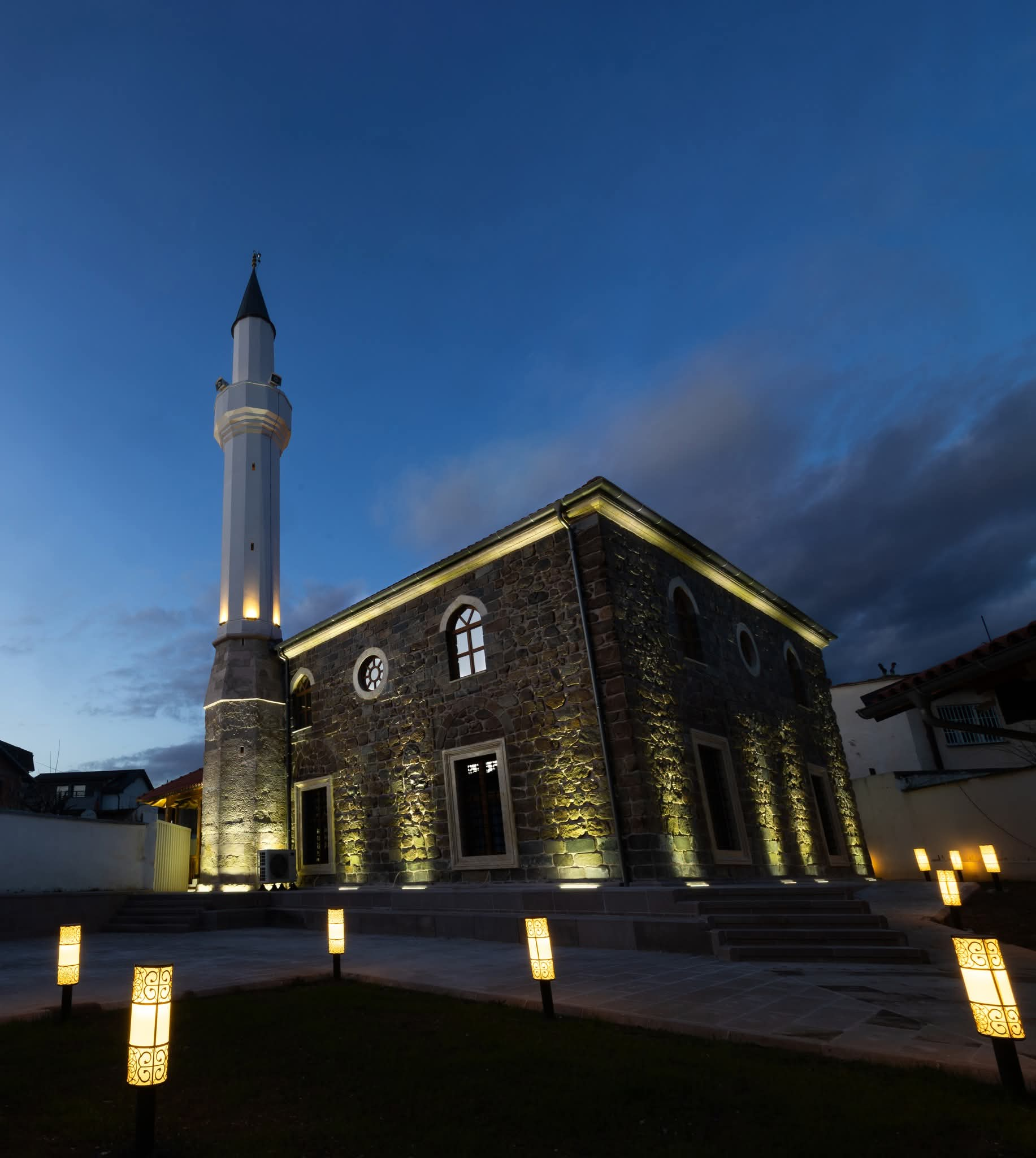
Exterior of the Pirinaz Mosque (BIK)

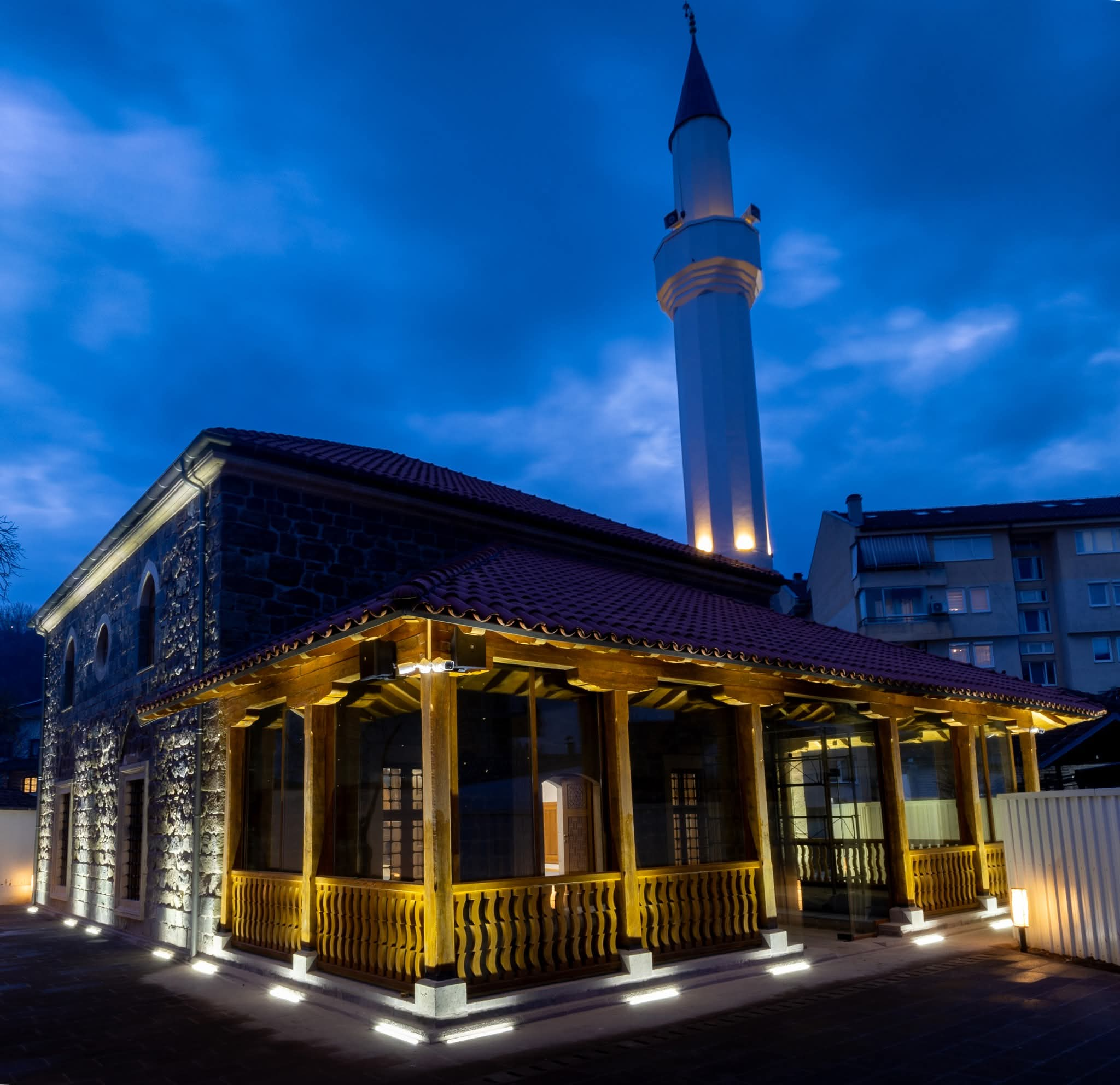
Exterior of the Pirinaz Mosque (BIK)

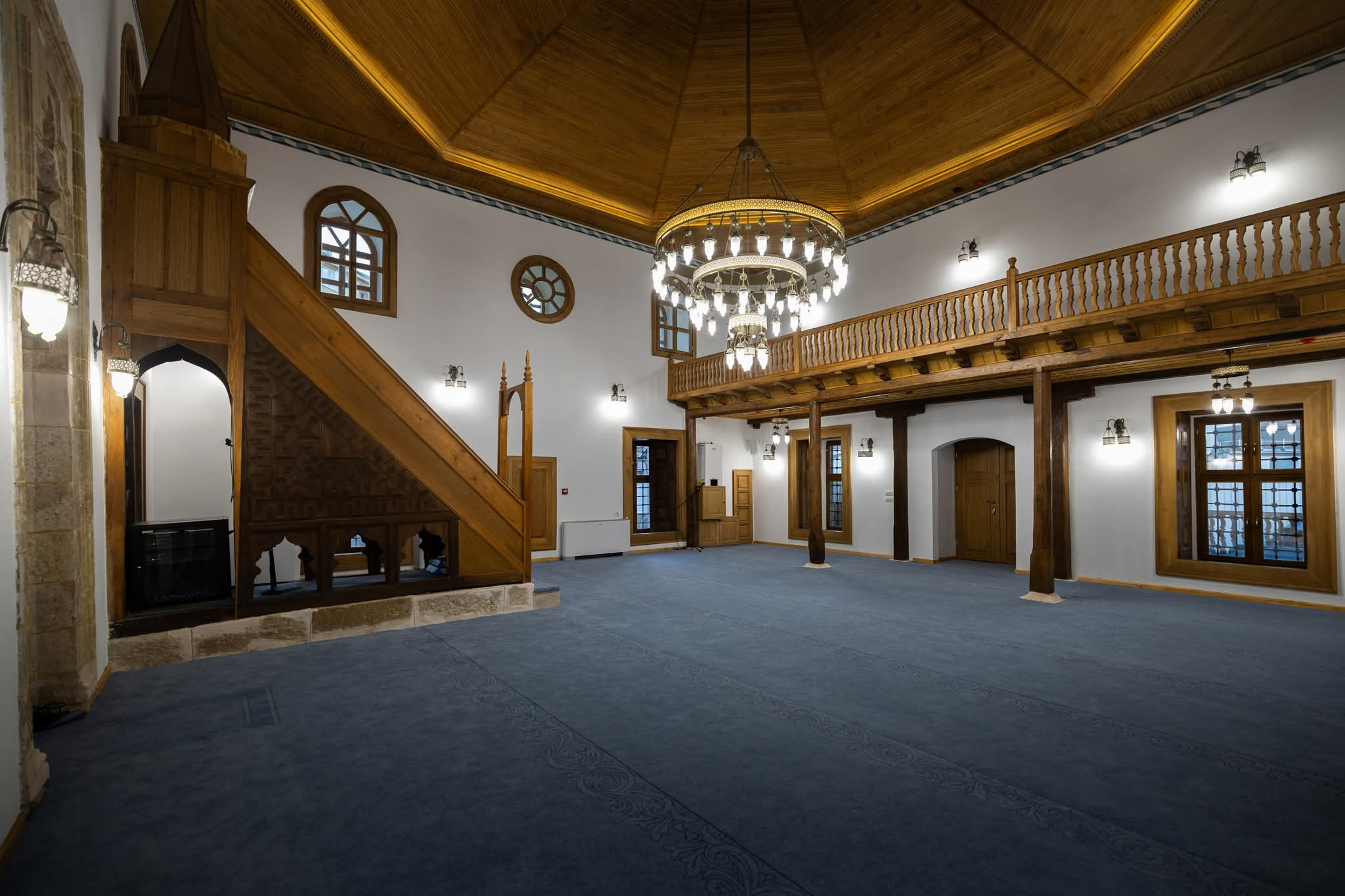
Interior of the Pirinaz Mosque (BIK)

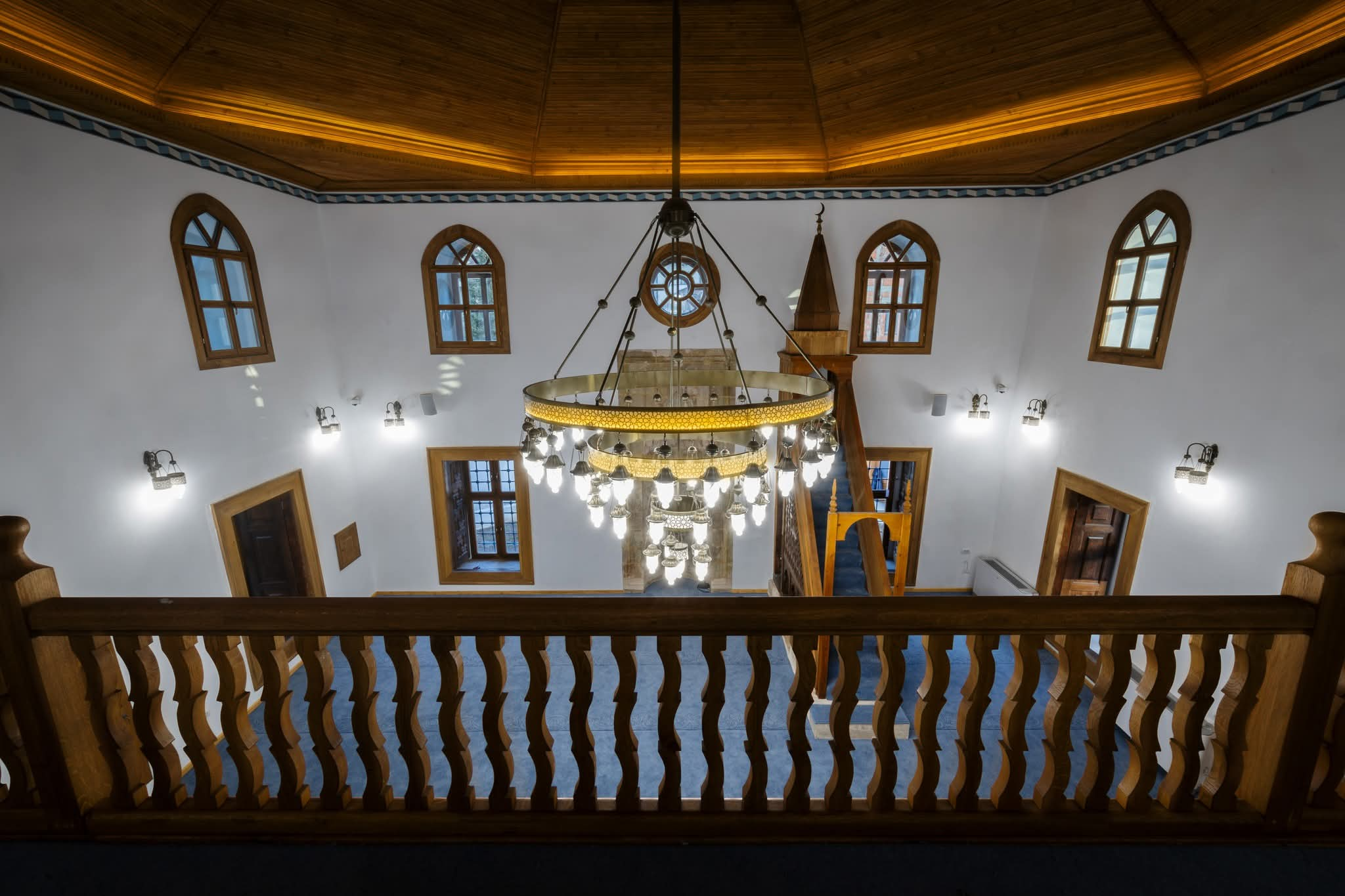
Interior of the Pirinaz Mosque (BIK)
