= Rabas =

- Village (Selo)
- Location within Serbia
- Coordinates: 44°21′N 19°49′E
- Country: Serbia
- District: Kolubara District
- Municipality: Valjevo

Population (2002)
  - Total: 150
- Time zone: UTC+1 (CET)
  - Summer (DST): UTC+2 (CEST)

Rabas is a village in the municipality of Valjevo, Serbia. According to the 2002 census, the village has a population of 150 people.

The Rabas river flows northeast of the village.

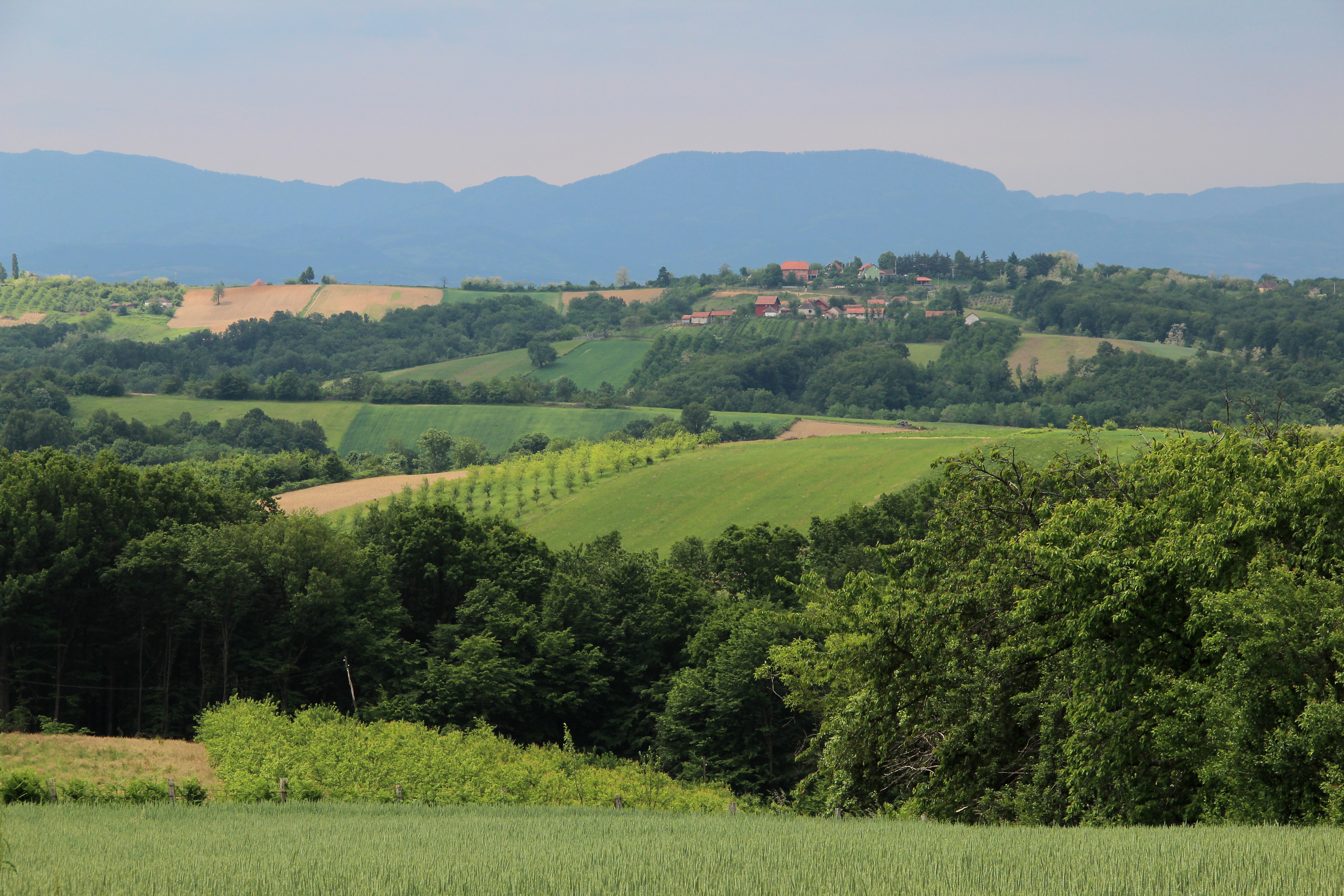
Rabas - panorama

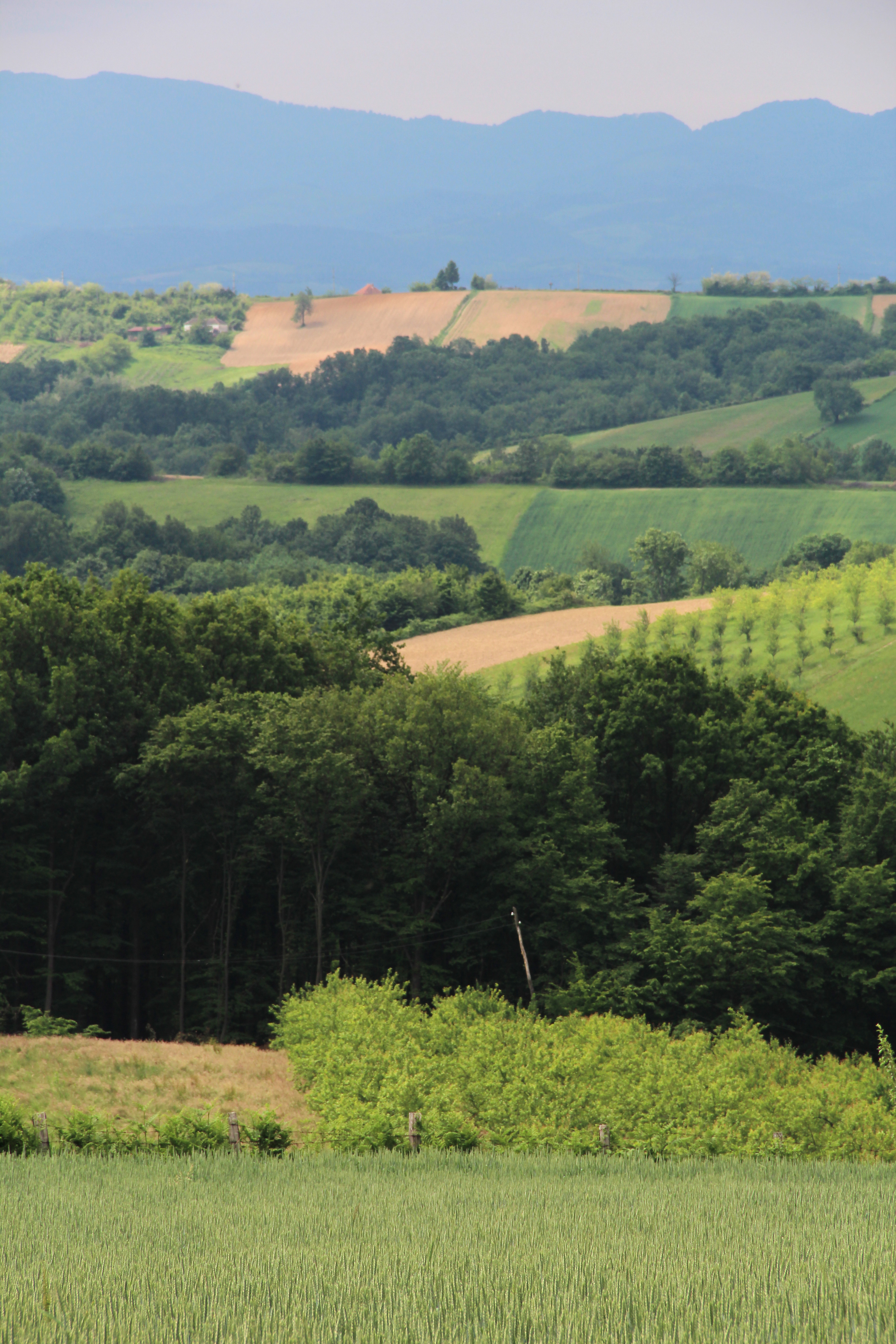
Rabas - panorama

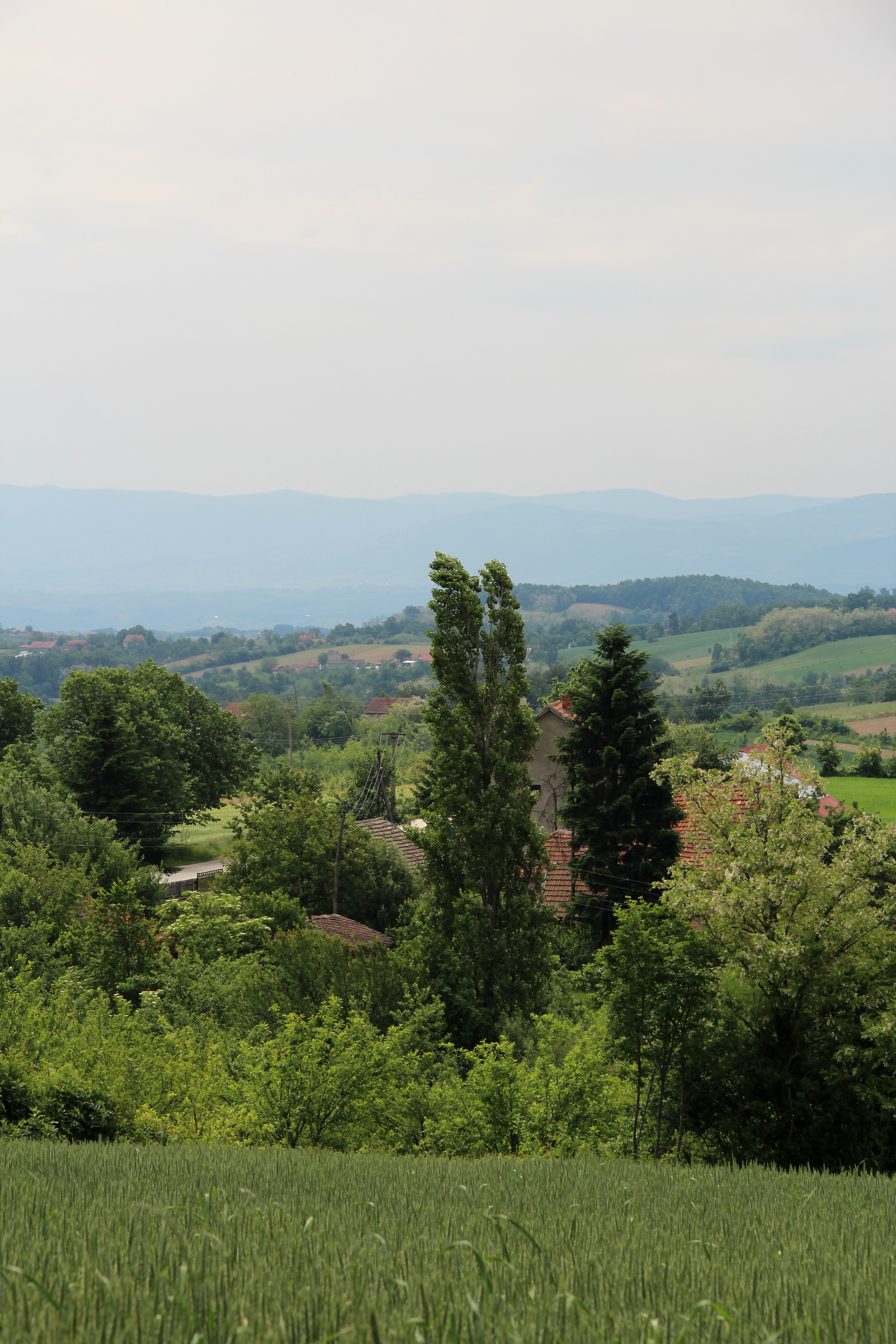
Rabas - panorama

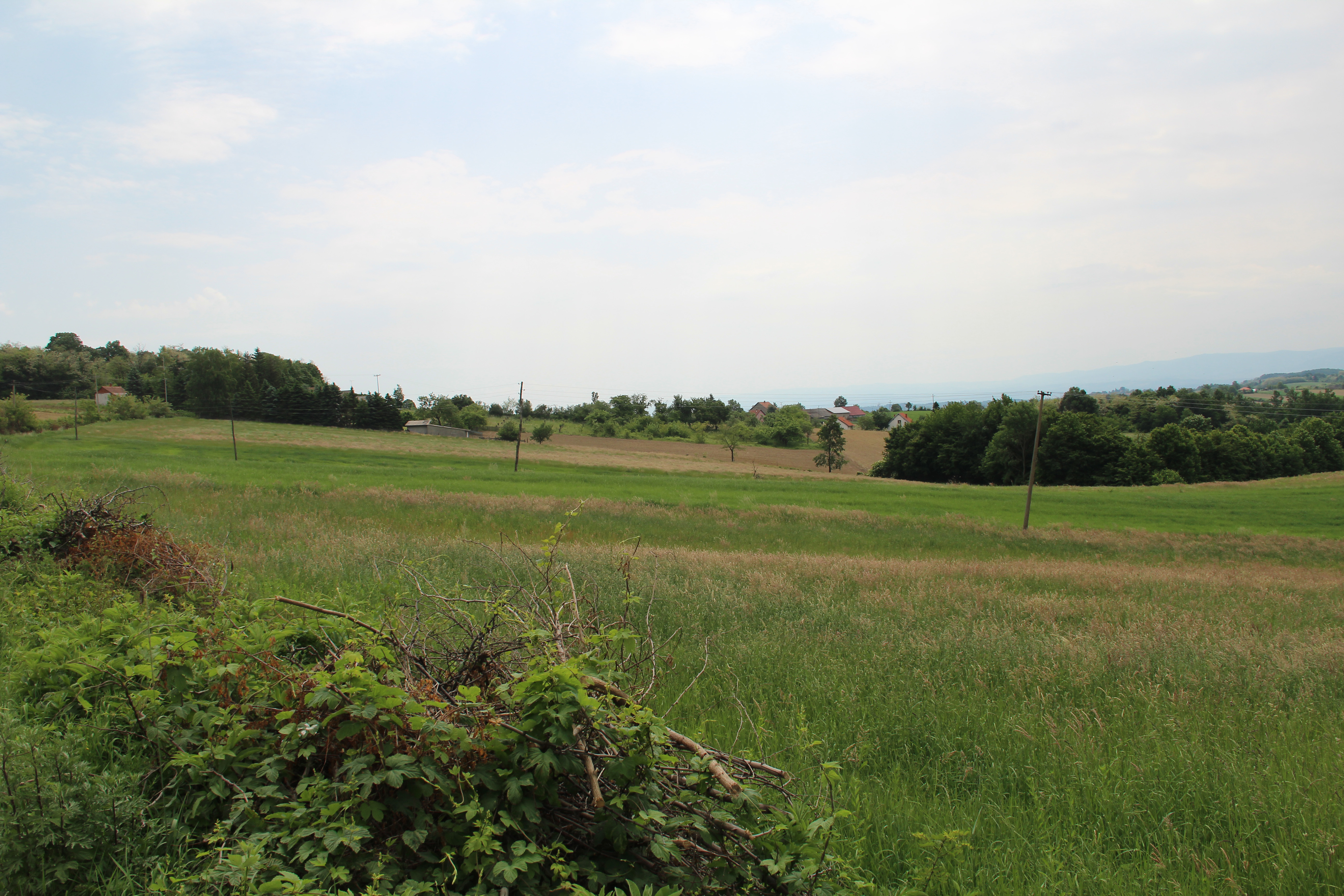
Rabas - panorama

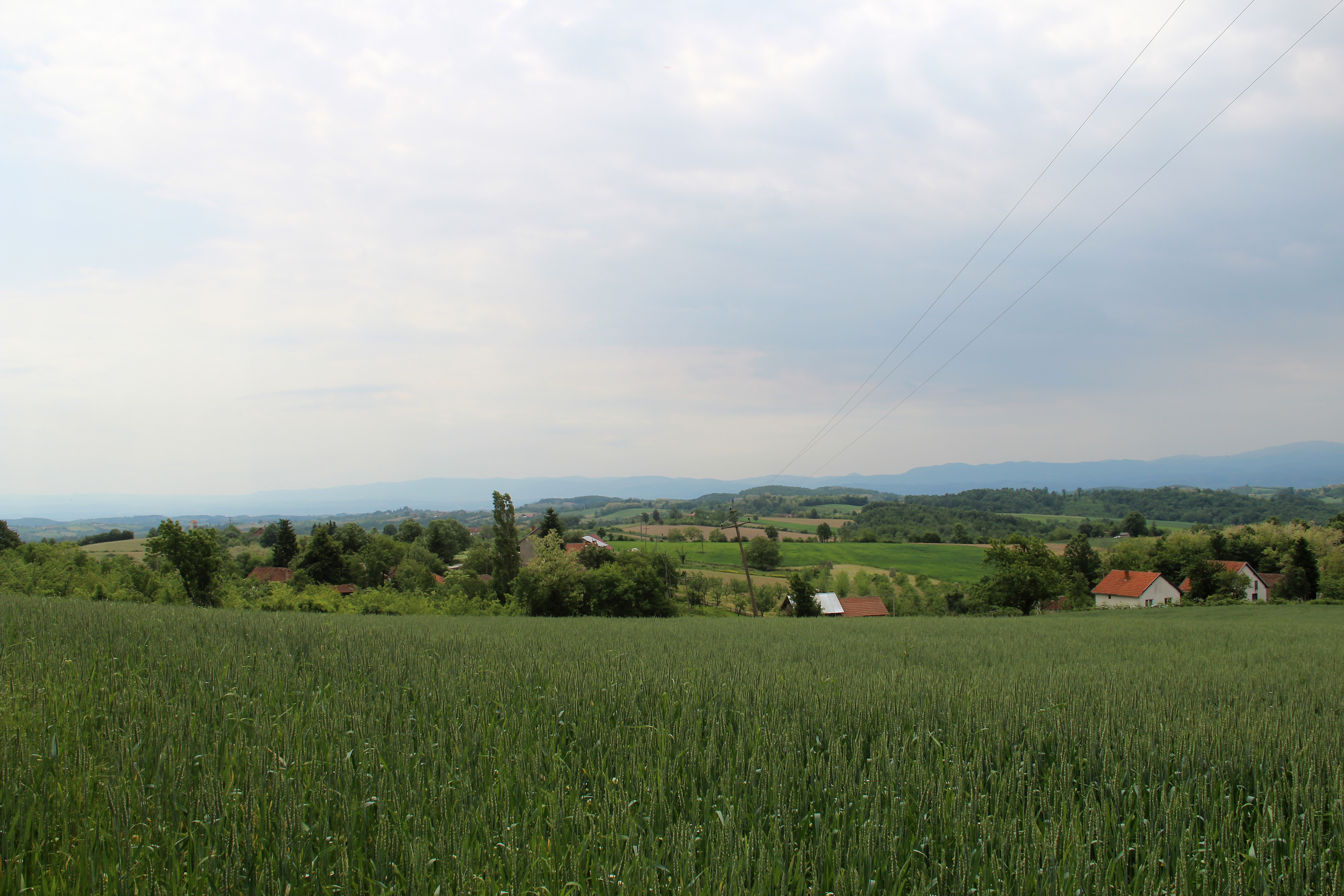
Rabas - panorama

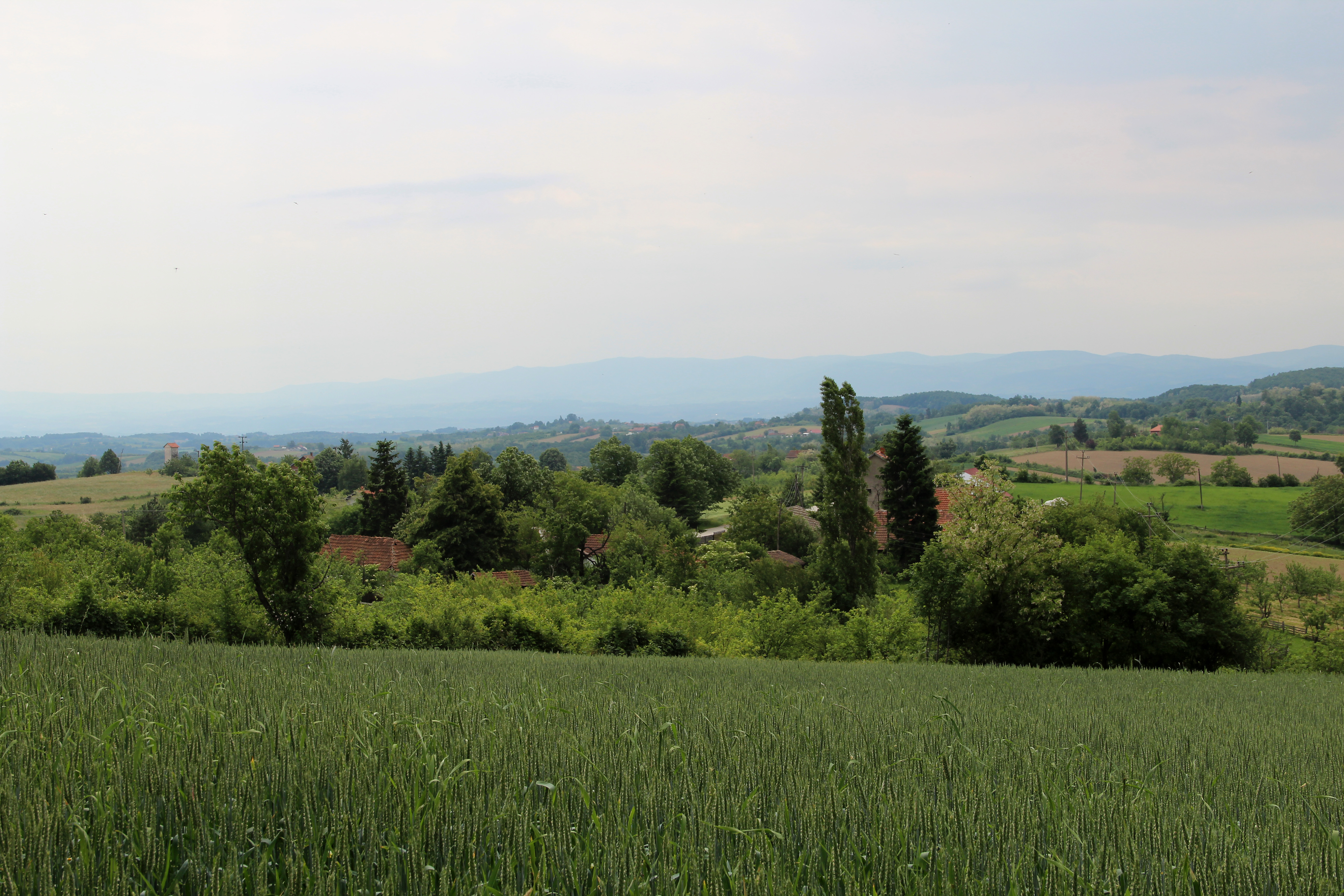
Rabas - panorama

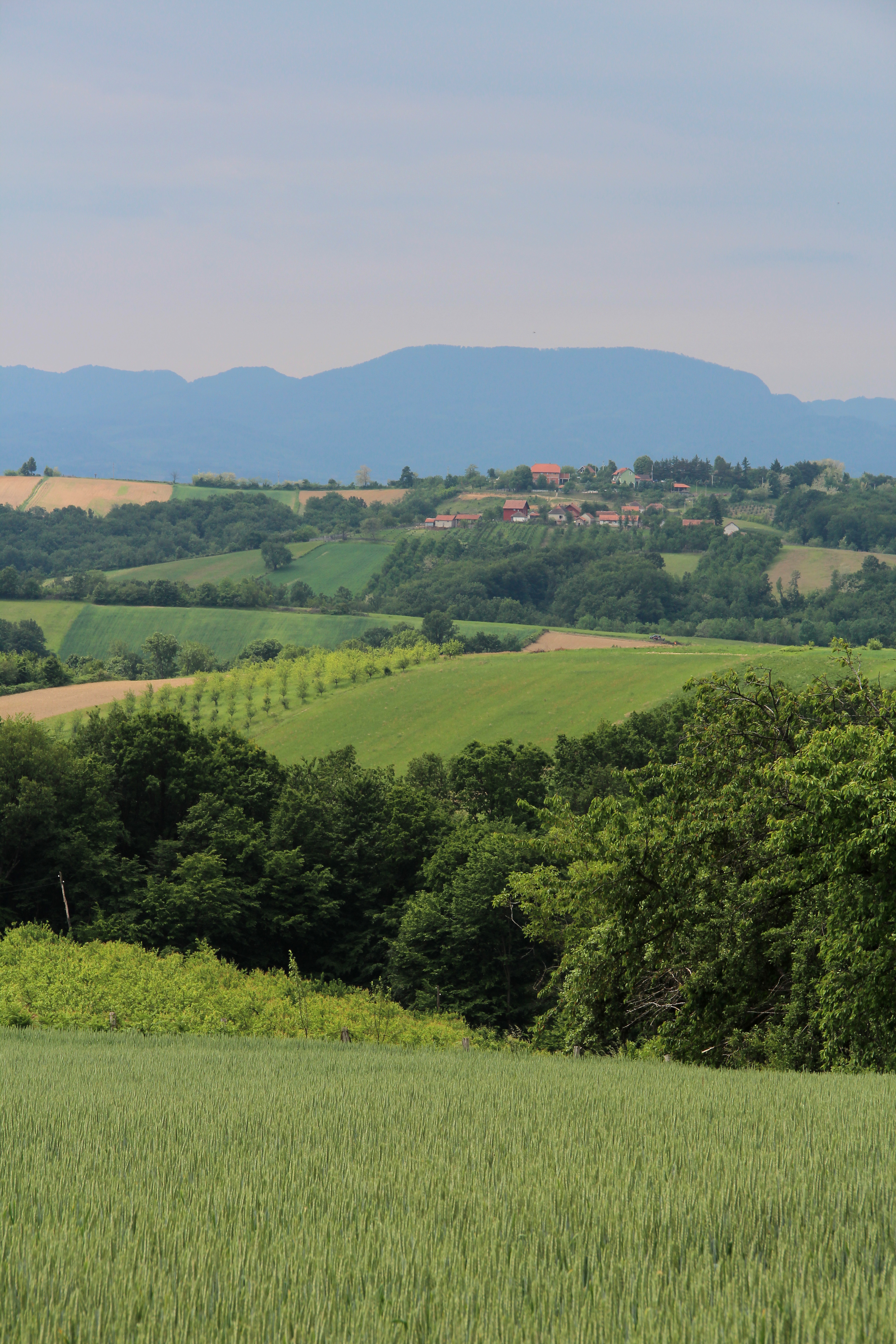
Rabas - panorama

== Economy ==
Controversial internet gaming company Pravi Pucati has its headquarters in rural Rabas, where online players fire real weapons controlled over the internet.
