= Greater Serbia =

Serbian nationalist and irredentist concept

One of the visions of the borders of Greater Serbia as advocated by Serbian Radical politician Vojislav Šešelj, defined by the Virovitica–Karlovac–Karlobag hypothetical boundary to the west.

The term Greater Serbia or Great Serbia (Serbian: Велика Србија, romanized: Velika Srbija) describes the Serbian nationalist and irredentist ideology of the creation of a Serb state which would incorporate all regions of traditional significance to Serbs, a South Slavic ethnic group, including regions outside modern-day Serbia that are partly populated by Serbs. The initial movement's main ideology (Pan-Serbism) was to unite all Serbs (or all territory historically ruled, seen to be populated by, or perceived to be belonging to Serbs) into one state, claiming, depending on the version, different areas of many surrounding countries, regardless of non-Serb populations present.

The Greater Serbian ideology includes claims to various territories aside from modern-day Serbia, including the whole of the former Yugoslavia except Slovenia and part of Croatia. According to Jozo Tomasevich, in some historical forms, Greater Serbian aspirations also included parts of Albania, Bulgaria, Hungary and Romania. Its inspiration comes from the medieval Serbian Empire which existed briefly in 14th-century Southeast Europe from 1346 to 1371, prior to the Ottoman conquest of the Balkans. Some territories intended to be incorporated in the Greater Serbia exceeded the boundaries of the Serbian Empire, however.

== Historical overview ==
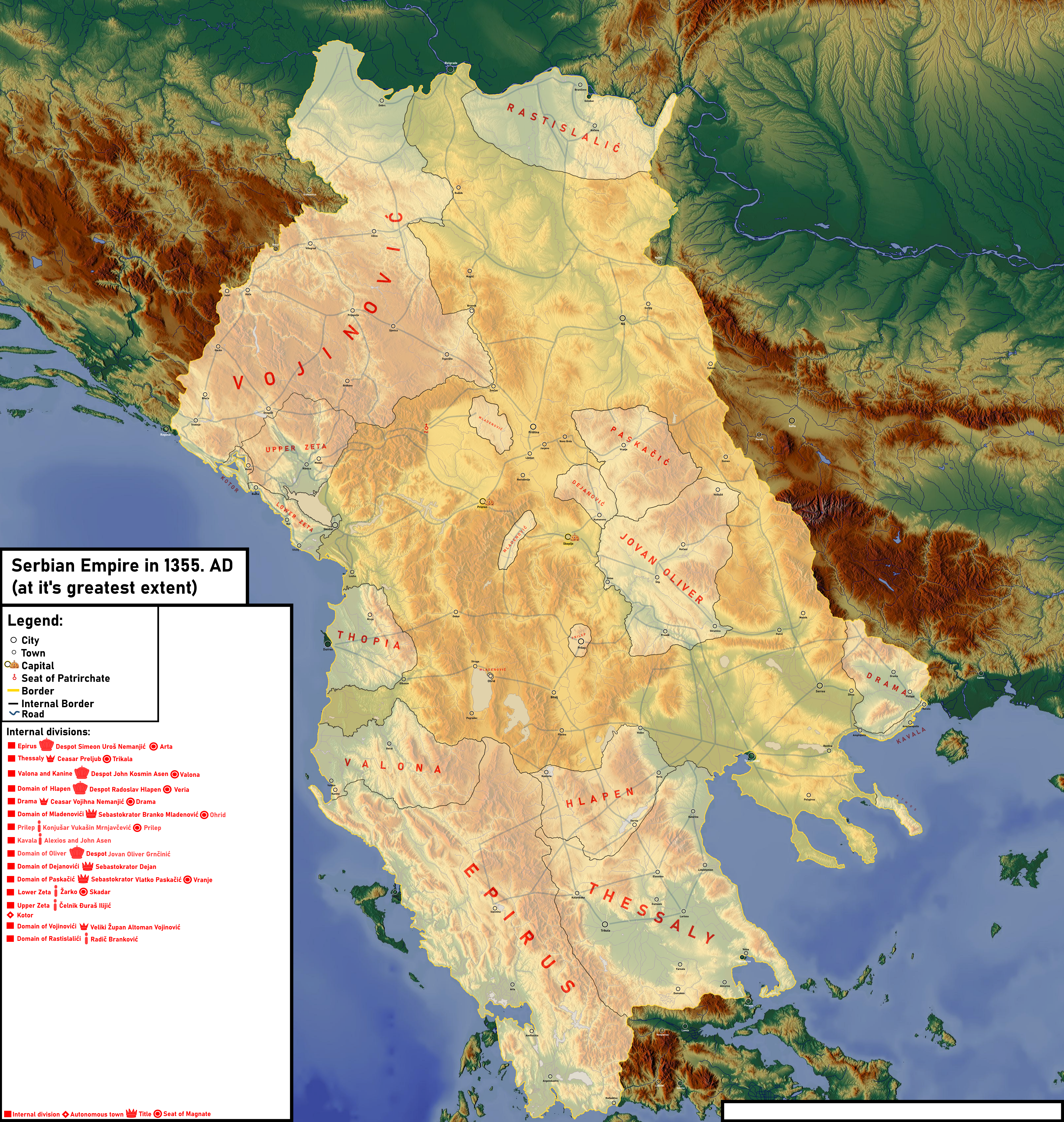
The 14th-century Serbian Empire at its greatest extent; the vast territory of the Empire later inspired 19th-century politicians to pursue territorial expansion across the Balkans for the newly formed Serbian state.

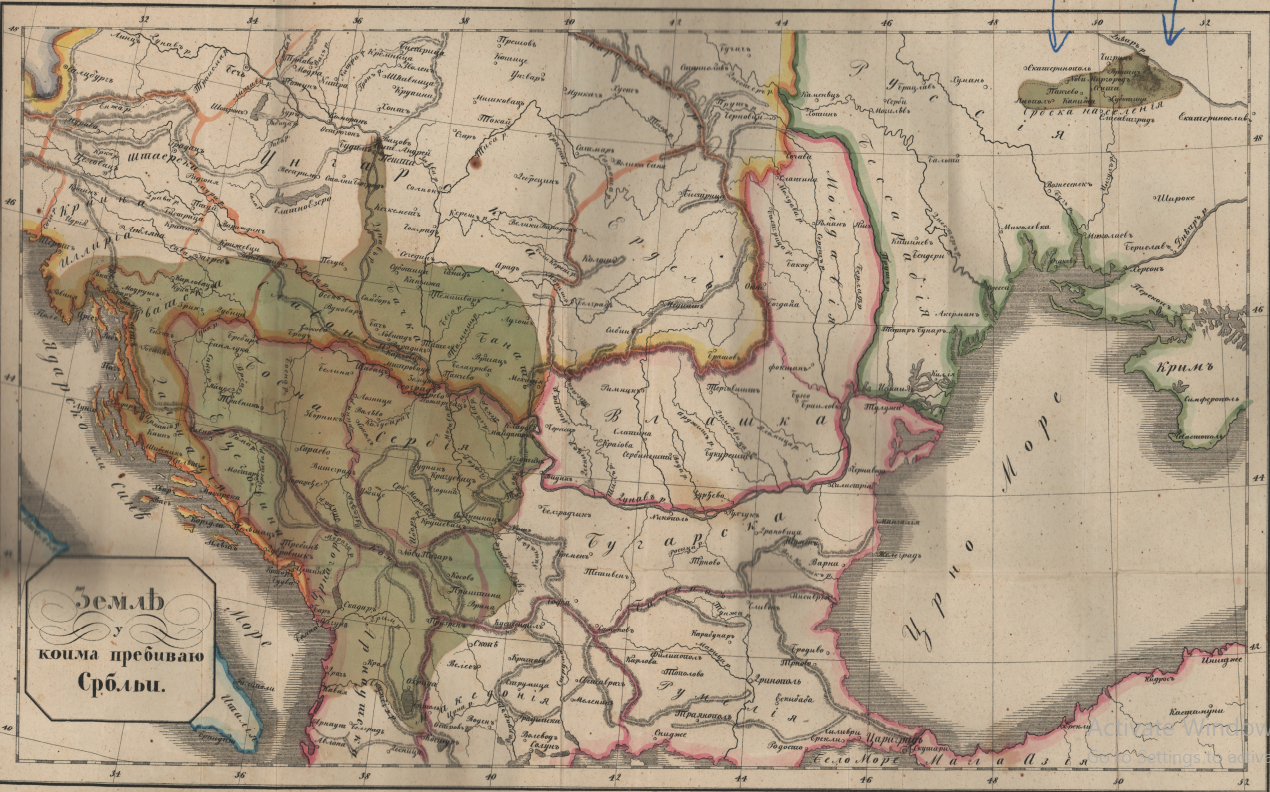
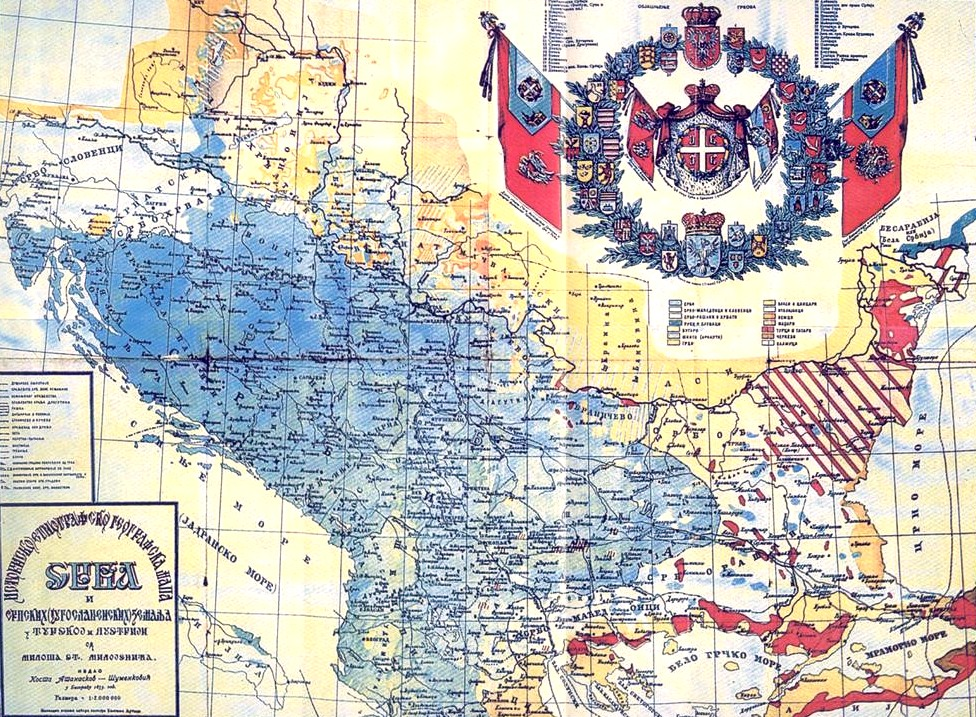
(1) Dimitrije Davidović's map (1821) which depicts most of the Western Balkans as inhabited by the Serbs (2) Miloš Milojević's map (1873) which depicts most of the South Slavs as Serbs.

Following the growing nationalistic tendency in Europe from the 18th century onwards (as exemplified in the unification of Italy), Serbs in Serbia – after first achieving the recognition of the Principality of Serbia within the Ottoman Empire in 1817 – experienced a popular desire for full unification with the Serbs of the remaining territories, mainly those living in neighbouring entities. However, as stated by Christopher Clark, the "underpinning the idea of the 'unification of all Serbs' was a mental image of Serbia that bore little relation to the political map of the Balkans at the turn of the twentieth century", and the "historical template" for the Serbian state was the restoration of the Serbian Empire during the time of Stefan Dušan (1346–1355). Although the empire was short-lived, multi-ethnic and did not include some territories (e.g. Bosnia), the restoration was perceived as a "historical right" compatible with creating a monoethnic nation-state, as the "Serb patriots saw no inconsistency here, since they argued that virtually all the inhabitants of these lands were essentially Serbs". These aspirations were also reproduced in books and maps, for example by Dimitrije Davidović (1821 and 1846), Miloš Milojević (1877), Spiridon Gopčević (1889), Vladan Đorđević (1902), but also in Europe by Apollon Aleksandrovich Maykov (1857), Henri Thiers (1862), Alexander Pypin and Włodzimierz Spasowicz (1879), Ernest Denis (1915), due to the Serbian diplomatic propaganda.

The Serbian Minister of Internal Affairs, Ilija Garašanin, a conservative statesman with Bismarckian aspirations, formulated the idea of Serbian territorial expansion in 1844 in Načertanije (Serbian: Начертаније), a secret draft political programme. According to the draft, the new Serbian state could include the neighboring areas of Montenegro, Northern Albania, Bosnia and Herzegovina. In the early-20th century, all political parties of the Kingdom of Serbia (except for the Social Democratic Party) planned to form a Balkan Federation, and generally accepted the idea of uniting all Serbs into one only Serbian state which would be a part of that proposed Balkan Federation. From the formation of the Principality until the First World War of 1914-1918, the Serbian state successively expanded its territory.

After the end of the Balkan Wars in 1913, the Kingdom of Serbia expanded towards the south, but there was a mixed reaction to the events, because promises of lands giving access to the Adriatic Sea remained unfulfilled. Instead, Serbia received the territories of Vardar Macedonia (coveted by the Kingdom of Bulgaria) and the Serbian Army had to evacuate the coastal territories that would become part of the newly-formed Principality of Albania. This settlement, together with the Austro-Hungarian annexation of Bosnia in 1908, frustrated Serbian aspirations: a large number of Serbs remained outside of the Serbian kingdom.

After World War I, a new unified state called the Kingdom of Serbs, Croats and Slovenes formed, which included the Kingdom of Serbia, the short-lived State of Slovenes, Croats and Serbs and some territories from the disintegrated Austro-Hungarian monarchy. Ruled by the Serbian royal family, the House of Karađorđević, it would be renamed as the Kingdom of Yugoslavia in 1929. During the inter-war period (1918 to 1939), many Serb-oriented political parties promoted the concept of a strong centralised country with the doctine of Yugoslavism, while their opponents favored decentralization and demanded autonomy for the regions.

Following the German-led invasion of Yugoslavia in 1941, tensions grew and erupted into one of the most brutal civil wars that occurred in World War II. The Royal Government soon capitulated and fled to exile in London. The Chetniks, who advocated the restoration of the monarchy, initially resisted the invaders, but would eventually collaborate with the Axis powers with the goal of forming a post-war Greater Serbia. On the other hand, the Partisans, a multi-ethnic antifascist movement, waged an ongoing guerrilla campaign against the occupying forces and supported the transformation of the old royal Yugoslavia into a socialist federal republic. The Serbs were largely divided between these two factions, leading to internal fighting. Others found themselves in the collaborationist factions of Milan Nedić and Dimitrije Ljotić such as the Serbian Volunteer Corps. Beside this, other Yugoslav non-Serb nationalists took advantage of the situation and allied themselves with the Axis powers, regarding this moment as their historical opportunity of fulfilling their own irredentist aspirations, which they saw as a better alternative to the Serbian-led rule of the interwar period.

== History ==
=== 18th-century plans for the restoration of the Serbian state ===
Throughout the eighteenth century, a number of political projects sought to re-establish Serbian statehood, with their authors looking to the Habsburg monarchy or the Russian Empire for support. An early initiative emerged in 1736–1737, when Serbian Patriarch Arsenije IV Jovanović Šakabenta proposed the creation of an autonomous territory called “Illyria” under Habsburg sovereignty. The envisioned territory would unite Serbia, Bosnia, Bulgaria, Herzegovina and Albania. Modelled on the constitutional position of the Kingdom of Hungary, this entity would have its own administration, military forces, nobility, religious institutions and schools. Its Serbian population, designated in the proposal as the Illyrian-Rascian nation, would be placed under the leadership of a patriarch holding the position of “supreme ruler”.

A separate programme for the reconstitution of the Serbian state was associated with the Montenegrin prince-bishop Vasilije Petrović in 1763. It envisaged the revival of the medieval Serbian state across a broad territory extending over Serbia, Bosnia, Bulgaria, Upper Albania, Dalmatia, Banat and Slavonia. The idea of establishing a larger Serbian political entity resurfaced in 1798, when Sava Ljubiša, acting as an emissary of Prince-Bishop Petar I Petrović of Montenegro, presented a proposal to the Russian authorities for a Kingdom of Old Rascia. The proposed state was intended to possess sufficient military resources to mobilise as many as 200,000 soldiers. Its conception drew on a 17th-century project attributed to Count Đorđe Branković.

A further initiative was presented to the Russian court in 1803 by Arsenije Gagović, an archimandrite of the Morača Monastery. His proposal envisaged a pan-Slavic political entity described as a “Slavic-Serb Empire”, which would be placed under Russian protection and governed by a member of the Russian ruling house. Gagović is believed to have prepared the scheme after consulting Stefan Stratimirović, the head of the Serbian Church in the Habsburg Monarchy.

=== Obradović's Pan-Serbism ===
The first person to formulate the modern idea of Pan-Serbism was Dositej Obradović (1739–1811), a writer and thinker who dedicated his writings to the "Slavoserbian people", which he described as "the inhabitants of Serbia, Bosnia, Herzegovina, Montenegro, Dalmatia, Croatia, Syrmium, Banat, and Bačka", and who he regarded as all his "Serbian brethren, regardless of their church and religion". Other proponents of Pan-Serbism included historian Jovan Rajić and politician and lawyer Sava Tekelija, both of whom published works incorporating many of the aforementioned areas under a single umbrella name of "Serbian lands". The concept of Pan-Serbism espoused by these three was not an imperialist one, based upon the notion of Serbian conquest, but a rationalist one. They all believed that rationalism would overcome the barriers of religion that separated the Slavs into Orthodox Christians, Catholics, and Muslims, uniting the peoples as one nation. The idea of a unification and homogenization by force was propounded by Petar II Petrović-Njegoš (1813–1851).

=== Stratimirović's Serbia Rediviva and Tekelija's Illyria ===
Stefan Stratimirović, the Serbian Metropolitan in Sremski Karlovci from 1790 to 1836 and the head of the Serbian Church in the Habsburg monarchy, was one of the Serbs who fought for independence, and unification. His most significant and influential political work is the Memorandum, written in June 1804. The core idea from the Memorandum stipulated that all Serbs should live in a single national state. This renewed Serbian national state (which may be called Serbia rediviva) was based on the idea that all Serbs, both those from Turkey (the Ottoman Empire) and those from Austria, should be united within it. Consequently, he proposed that the following territories of Austria inhabited by Serbs should be included which Stratimirović himself called the Slavonic-Serbian State (Slavenoserbsko gosudarstvo): the Bay of Kotor with the town of Kotor, the parts of Dalmatia and Croatia east of the Una River, the Krka River, and the city of Šibenik, the territory between the Danube River, the Sava River, and the Vuka River and its surroundings, and the greater part of Slavonia.

Serbia rediviva would also consist, according to his view, of the following historical-ethnic Serbian lands which at that time belonged to the Ottoman Empire: the Belgrade Pashalik (from the Sava and Danube rivers in the north to the West Morava River in the south, and from the Drina River in the west to the Timok River in the east); Bosnia and Herzegovina, Montenegro, Kosovo and Metohija, and the northwestern part of present-day Bulgaria with the town of Vidin, its surrounding area, and the Lom River. He also mentioned the part of western Wallachia between the Danube and Jiu rivers, present-day southeastern Serbia with the towns of Niš, Leskovac, Vranje, and Bujanovac, and the northern part of present-day Albania with the town of Shkodra which should be considered part of the "ethnic space" of the Serbian people.

In determining the borders of the renewed Serbia, he applied both the historical and the ethnic principle. According to the first principle, the territories of medieval Serbia and Duklja (Montenegro) would constitute part of it. According to the second principle, all Balkan territories inhabited by ethnic Serbs—that is, according to Stratimirović’s understanding, the entire Orthodox population of the South Slavs whose mother tongue was the Shtokavian dialect and whose literary language was Slavonic-Serbian—would also be included in this state. Regarding the determination of the ethnic space of the Serbian people, the Metropolitan of Karlovci was strongly influenced by the theory of the ethnic-linguistic criterion for defining the Serbian nation, which at that time was favored by the Serbian nobleman from Arad and president of the Matica srpska, Sava Tekelija. Tekelija’s ethnic-linguistic concept of “Serbdom” was elaborated in his short essay titled Description of Life (Opisanije života).

Tekelija believed that all members of the South Slavs who used the Shtokavian, Kajkavian, or Chakavian dialect, regardless of their religious affiliation, belonged to the true Serbian people. Thus, according to his understanding, the following South Slavic lands were inhabited by ethnic-linguistic Serbs: Serbia in the narrower sense (minus Vojvodina), Kosovo, Bosnia and Herzegovina, Bulgaria, Montenegro, North Macedonia, the Republic of Ragusa, Carniola, Styria, Carinthia, Southern Hungary (present-day Vojvodina), and Northern Albania. Tekelija advocated that all the above-mentioned South Slavic territories, inhabited by these "Serbs", should form a single unified Serbian national state, whose borders would extend from the Black Sea to the Alps, and from the Adriatic Sea to north of the Danube. This united Serbia would be inhabited by a majority Orthodox population and a minority Roman Catholic and Muslim population. Tekelija called all the above-mentioned "Serbian", i.e. South Slavic, lands by the common name Illyria (Illyricum), being strongly influenced by the widely spread theory dating back to the Middle Ages that all South Slavs were of Old-Balkan Illyrian origin, who, in Tekelija’s view, were ethnic-linguistic Serbs. Stratimirović did not fully adopt Tekelija’s linguistic conception as he believed that only the Orthodox believers of the South Slavic population who used the Shtokavian dialect as their spoken language and Slavonic-Serbian as their literary language were, in essence, true ethnic Serbs. Thus, Stratimirović’s concept of defining Serbdom can be described as a religious-linguistic one.

=== Slaveno–Serb Empire of Petar I Petrović ===
Petar I Petrović-Njegoš, Prince-Bishop of Montenegro, conceived a plan in 1807 to revive a Serbian Empire ("Slaveno–Serb empire"), which he informed the Russian court. Earlier, in June 1804, Habsburg Serb metropolitan Stefan Stratimirović informed the Russian court of the same plan. Petar I's plan was to unite Podgorica, Spuž, Žabljak, the Bay of Kotor, Bosnia, Herzegovina, Dubrovnik and Dalmatia with Montenegro. The title of Serbian emperor would be held by the Russian emperor. The French–Russian peace treaty thwarted the plan. After the French conquered Dalmatia, they offered Petar I the title of "Patriarch of all of the Serb nation or all Illyricum" under the condition that he stop cooperation with Russia and accept a French protectorate, which he declined, fearing eventual Papal jurisdiction. The Metropolitanate of Cetinje began exerting influence towards Brda and Old Herzegovina, which considered Montenegro as the leader for liberation. While his reputation and influence reached the surrounding lands, he increasingly directed himself to Revolutionary Serbia as the backbone for liberation and unification. The project is included in several historiographical works.

=== Garašanin's Načertanije ===
Some authors claim that the roots of the Greater Serbian ideology can be traced back to Serbian minister Ilija Garašanin's Načertanije (1844). Načertanije ("The Draft") was influenced by Conseils sur la conduite a suivre par la Serbie, a document written by Polish Prince Adam Czartoryski in 1843 and the revised version by Czech ambassador to Serbia, Franjo Zach, "Zach's Plan". However, Zach "envisaged a federal organization of the South Slav peoples. But where Zach had written 'South Slav', Garašanin substituted 'Serb" or 'Serbian'. This and other changes transformed Zach's cosmopolitan vision into a more narrowly focused Serbian nationalist manifesto".

"A plan must be constructed which does not limit Serbia to her present borders, but endeavors to absorb all the Serbian people around her."

— Ilija Garašanin, Načertanije

The work claimed lands that were inhabited by Bulgarians, Macedonians, Albanians, Montenegrins, Bosniaks, Hungarians, Croats and Slovenes as part of Greater Serbia. Garašanin's plan also included methods of spreading Serbian influence in the claimed lands. He proposed ways to influence Croats and Slavic Muslims, who Garašanin regarded as "Serbs of Catholic faith" and "Serbs of Islamic faith". The document also emphasized the necessity of cooperation between the Balkan nations and it advocated that the Balkans should be governed by the nations from the Balkans.

This plan was kept secret until 1906 and has been interpreted by some as a blueprint for Serbian national unification, with the primary concern of strengthening Serbia's position by inculcating Serbian and pro-Serbian national ideology in all surrounding peoples that are considered to be devoid of national consciousness. Because Načertanije was a secret document until 1906, it could not have affected national consciousness at the popular level. However, some scholars suggest that from the second half of the nineteenth century to the outbreak of World War I, "leading political groups and social strata in Serbia were thoroughly imbued with the ideas in the Nacertanije and differed only in intensity of feeling and political conceptualization". Political insecurity, more so than Yugoslavism or Serbian nationalism, appeared to be the prevailing reasoning behind the idea of expanding Serbian borders. The document is one of the most contested of nineteenth-century Serbian history, with rival interpretations. Some scholars argue that Garašanin was an inclusive Yugoslavist, while others maintain that he was an exclusive Serbian nationalist seeking a Greater Serbia.

=== Vuk Karadžić's Pan-Serbism ===
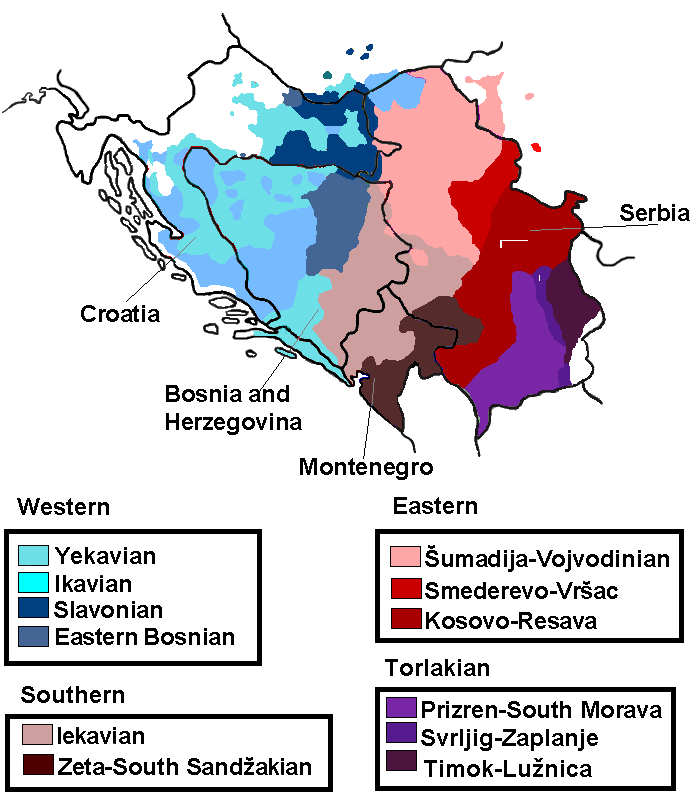
Shtokavian dialect, whose speakers Vuk Karadžić considered Serbs in the 19th century.

The most notable Serbian linguist of the 19th century, Vuk Karadžić, was a follower of the view that all South Slavs who speak the Shtokavian dialect (of Serbo-Croatian) were Serbs, speaking the Serbian language. As this definition implied that large areas of continental Croatia, Dalmatia, and Bosnia and Herzegovina, including areas inhabited by Roman Catholics – Vuk Karadžić is considered by some to be the progenitor of the Greater Serbia program. More precisely, Karadžić was the shaper of modern secular Serbian national consciousness, with the goal of incorporating all indigenous Shtokavian speakers (Eastern Orthodox, Catholic, Muslim) into one, modern Serbian nation. Although there were many people (mostly the Croats), as Karadžić conceded, "who still find it difficult to call themselves Serbs", but "they will gradually become used to it".

There are at least 5 million people who speak the same language, but by religion they can be split into three groups ... Only the first 3 million call themselves Serbs, but the rest will not accept the name.

— Vuk Karadžić, Srbi svi i svuda (Serbs All and Everywhere)

German historian Michael Weithmann considers that Karadžić expressed dangerous ideological and political idea in scientific shape i.e. that all southern Slavs are Serbs while Czech historian Jan Rychlik consider that Karadžić became a propagator of greater Serbian ideology and uttered a theory according to which all Yugoslav people speaking the shtokavian dialect are Serbs. This view is not shared by Andrew Baruch Wachtel (Making a Nation, Breaking a Nation) who sees him as a partisan of South Slav unity, albeit in a limited sense, in that his linguistic definition emphasized what united South Slavs rather than the religious differences that had earlier divided them. However, one might argue that such a definition is very partisan: Karadžić himself eloquently and explicitly professed that his aim was to unite all native Shtokavian speakers whom he identified as Serbs. Therefore, Vuk Karadžić's central linguistic-political aim was the growth of the realm of Serbdom according to his ethnic-linguistic ideas and not a unity of any sort between Serbs and the other nations. A clerical support to Greater Serbian ideology, and Karadžić's idea, was provided by Nikodim Milaš in his writings of Pravoslavna Dalmacija (1901).

=== Balkan Wars ===
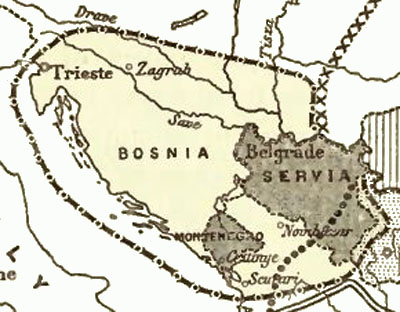
Greater Serbian aspirations before the Balkan Wars 1912–1913, according to the Report of the International Commission to Inquire into the Causes and Conduct of the Balkan Wars (1914).

The idea of reclaiming historic Serbian territory has been put into action several times during the 19th and 20th centuries, notably in Serbia's southward expansion in the Balkan Wars. Serbia claimed "historical rights" to the possession of Macedonia, acquired by Stefan Dušan in fourteenth century.

...for economic independence, Serbia must acquire access to the Adriatic Sea and one part of the Albanian coastline: by occupation of the territory or by acquiring economic and transportation rights to this region. This, therefore, implies occupying an ethnographically foreign territory, but one that must be occupied due to particularly important economic interests and vital needs.

— Jovan Cvijić

Serbia gained significant territorial expansion in the Balkan Wars and almost doubled its territory, with the areas populated mostly by non-Serbs (Albanians, Bulgarians, Turks and others). Serbia's most important goal of the Balkan Wars was access to the open sea. The Kingdom of Serbia occupied most of the interior of Albania and Albania's Adriatic coast. A series of massacres of Albanians in the Balkan Wars were committed by the Serbian and Montenegrin Army. According to the Report of the International Commission on the Balkan Wars, Serbia consider annexed territories "as a dependency, a sort of conquered colony, which these conquerors might administer at their good pleasure". Newly acquired territories were subjected to military government, and were not included in Serbia's constitutional system. The opposition press demanded the rule of law for the population of the annexed territories and the extension of the constitution of the Kingdom of Serbia to these regions.

The Royal Serbian Army captured Durazzo (Albanian: Durrës) on 29 November 1912 without any resistance. Orthodox Christian metropolitan of Durrës Jakob gave a particularly warm welcome to the new authorities. Due to Jakob's intervention to the Serbian authorities several Albanian guerrilla units were saved and avoided execution. The army of the Kingdom of Serbia retreated from Durrës in April 1913 under pressure of the naval fleet of the Great Powers, but it remained in other parts of Albania for the next two months.

=== Black Hand ===
The secret military society called Unity or Death, popularly known as the Black Hand, headed by Serbian colonel Dragutin Dimitrijević Apis, which took an active and militant stance on the issue of a Greater Serbian state. This organization is believed to have been responsible for numerous atrocities following the Balkan Wars in 1913.

=== World War I and the creation of Yugoslavia ===
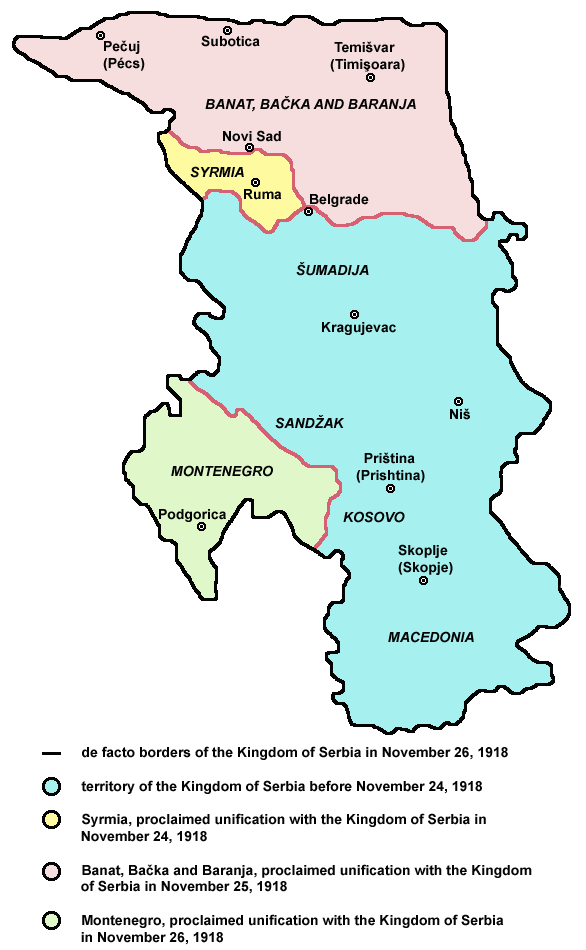
In late November 1918, at the end of the First World War, Syrmia, Banat, Bačka and Baranja, and Montenegro proclaimed its unification with the Kingdom of Serbia and entered into Yugoslavia as part of Serbia (Note: the map shown – Bačka, Banat, Baranja – represents a short time period, during military demarcation, not the actual unified territory).

By 1914 the Greater Serbian concept was eventually replaced by the Yugoslav Pan-Slavic movement. After the First World War, Serbia achieved a maximalist nationalist aspirations with the unification of the south Slavic regions of Austria-Hungary and Montenegro, into a Serb-dominated Kingdom of Yugoslavia.

The Treaty of London (1915) of the allies would assign to Serbia the territories of Bosnia and Herzegovina, Srem, Bačka, Slavonia (against Italian objections) and northern Albania (to be divided with Montenegro).

During the Kingdom of Serbs, Croats and Slovenes, the government of the Kingdom pursued a linguistic Serbisation policy towards the Macedonians in Macedonia, then called "Southern Serbia" (unofficially) or "Vardar Banovina" (officially). The dialects spoken in this region were referred to as dialects of Serbo-Croatian. Either way, those southern dialects were suppressed with regards education, military and other national activities, and their usage was punishable.

=== World War II and Moljević's Homogenous Serbia ===
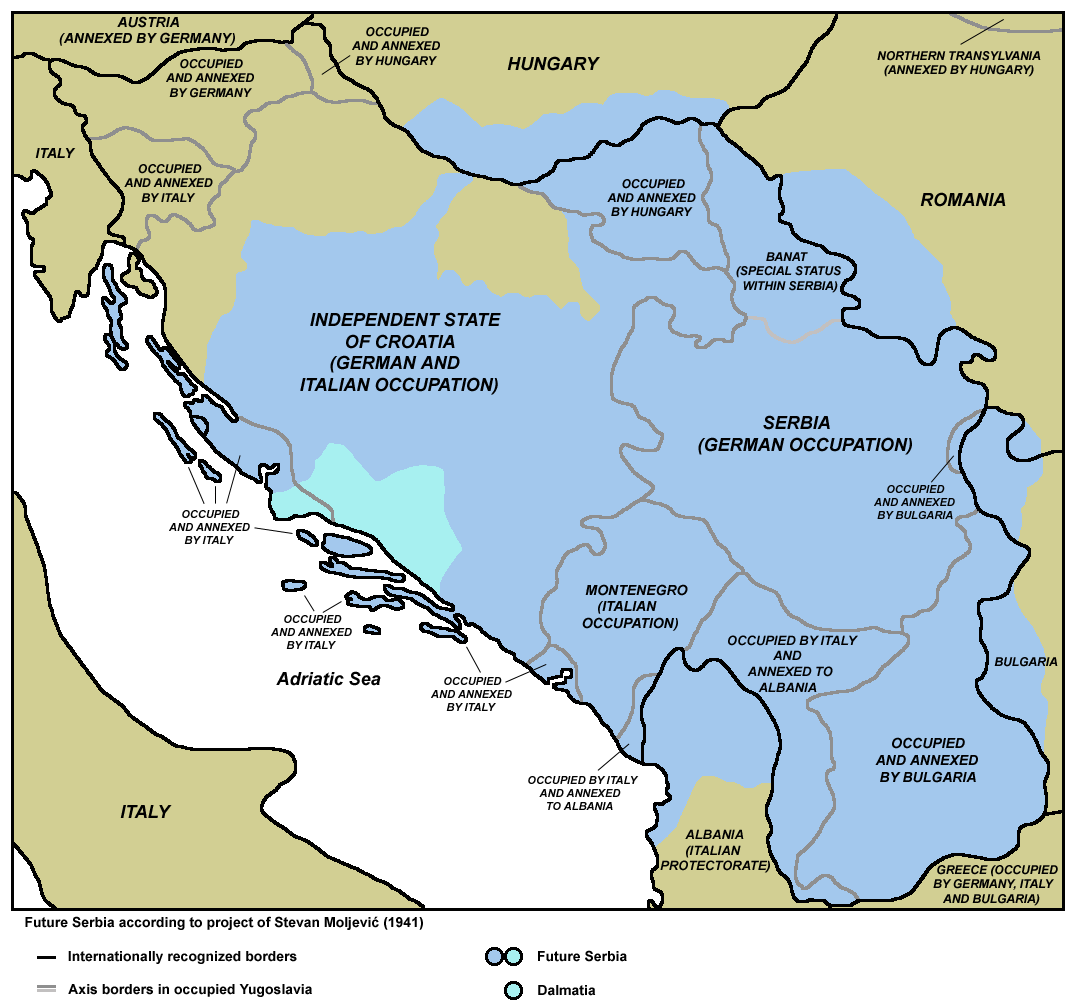
Moljević's "Homogenous Serbia", 1941.

During World War II, the Serbian royalist Yugoslav Army in the Fatherland which was headed by General Draža Mihailović attempted to define its vision of a postwar future. One of its intellectuals was the Bosnian Serb nationalist Stevan Moljević who, in 1941, proposed in a paper which was titled "Homogenous Serbia" that an even larger Greater Serbia should be created, incorporating not only Bosnia and much of Croatia but also chunks of Romania, Bulgaria, Albania and Hungary in areas where Serbs did not represent a significant minority. In the territories which were under their military control, the Chetniks waged ethnic cleansing in a genocidal campaign against ethnic Croats and Bosnian Muslims. The death toll is estimated to be 50,000 to 68,000 Muslims and Croats. Their tactics were, to at least an extent, a reaction to the terror carried out by the fascist, ultranationalist Croatian Ustaše who ruled the Independent State of Croatia (NDH), and killed hundreds of thousands of Serbs, along with Jews, and Roma, expelled Orthodox Serbs and forcefully converted them to Catholicism.

The Serbs today have a primary and basic duty – to create and organize a homogeneous Serbia which must consist of the entire ethnic territory on which the Serbs live.

— Stevan Moljević, Homogenous Serbia

Moljević's ideas were a point of discussion at a Chetnik congress which was held in the village of Ba in central Serbia in January 1944. It is difficult to assess how influential they were, due to the lack of records from the Ba congress. Ultimately, the proposal at the Ba congress contained a muted form of Greater Serbia aims and a more democratic version of the pre-war Yugoslav state, in order to attract support from the west and other Yugoslav nationalities opposed to Josip Broz Tito's Partisans. It never came due to the Chetniks' defeat by the Partisans, initially a movement predominantly composed of Serbs which became more multi-ethnic by this time.

== Role in the dissolution of Yugoslavia ==
=== SANU Memorandum ===
Memorandum of the Serbian Academy of Sciences and Arts (1986) was the single most important document to set into motion the pan-Serbian movement of the late 1980s which led to Slobodan Milošević's rise to power and the subsequent Yugoslav wars. The authors of the Memorandum included the most influential Serbian intellectuals, among them: Dobrica Ćosić, Pavle Ivić, Antonije Isaković, Dušan Kanazir, Mihailo Marković, Miloš Macura, Dejan Medaković, Miroslav Pantić, Nikola Pantić, Ljubiša Rakić, Radovan Samardžić, Miomir Vukobratović, Vasilije Krestić, Ivan Maksimović, Kosta Mihailović, Stojan Čelić and Nikola Čobelić. Philosopher Christopher Bennett characterized the memorandum as "an elaborate, if crude, conspiracy theory." The memorandum claimed systematic discrimination against Serbs and Serbia culminating with the allegation that the Serbs of Kosovo and Metohija were being subjected to genocide. According to Bennett, despite most of these claims being obviously absurd, the memorandum was merely one of several similar polemics published at the time.

The Memorandum's defenders claim that far from calling for a breakup of Yugoslavia on Greater Serbian lines, the document was in favor of Yugoslavia. Its support for Yugoslavia was however conditional on fundamental changes to end what the Memorandum argued was the discrimination against Serbia which was inbuilt into the Yugoslav constitution. The chief of these changes was abolition of the autonomy of Kosovo and Vojvodina. According to Norman Cigar, because the changes were unlikely to be accepted passively, the implementation of the Memorandum's program would only be possible by force.

=== Milošević's rise to power ===
With the rise to power of Milošević the Memorandum's discourse became mainstream in Serbia. According to Bennett, Milošević used a rigid control of the media to organize a propaganda campaign in which the Serbs were the victims and stressed the need to readjust Yugoslavia due to the alleged bias against Serbia. This was then followed by Milošević's anti-bureaucratic revolution in which the provincial governments of Vojvodina and Kosovo and the Republican government of Montenegro, were overthrown giving Milošević the dominating position of four votes out of eight in Yugoslavia's collective presidency. Milošević had achieved such a dominant position for Serbia because, according to Bennett, the old communist authorities had failed to stand up to him. During August 1988, supporters of the Anti-Bureaucratic Revolution were reported to have shouted Greater Serbia themed chants of "Montenegro is Serbia!".

Croatia and Slovenia denounced the demands by Milošević for a more centralized system of government in Yugoslavia and they began to demand that Yugoslavia be made a full multi-party confederal state. Milošević claimed that he opposed a confederal system but also declared that should a confederal system be created, the external borders of Serbia would be an "open question", insinuating that his government would pursue creating a Greater Serbia if Yugoslavia was decentralized. Milosevic stated: "These are the questions of borders, essential state questions. The borders, as you know, are always dictated by the strong, never by weak ones."

Dissolution of Yugoslavia (1991–2008)

By this point several opposition parties in Serbia were openly calling for a Greater Serbia, rejecting the then existing boundaries of the Republics as the artificial creation of Tito's partisans. These included Šešelj's Serbian Radical Party, claiming that the recent changes had rectified most of the anti-Serb bias that the Memorandum had alleged. Milošević supported the groups calling for a Greater Serbia, insisting on the demand for "all Serbs in one state". The Socialist Party of Serbia (SPS) appeared to be defenders of the Serb people in Yugoslavia. Serbian president Slobodan Milošević, who was also the leader of the SPS, repeatedly stated that all Serbs should enjoy the right to be included in Serbia. Opponents and critics of Milošević claimed that "Yugoslavia could be that one state but the threat was that, should Yugoslavia break up, then Serbia under Milošević would carve out a Greater Serbia".

Major changes took place in Yugoslavia in 1990 when free elections brought opposition parties to power in Croatia and Slovenia. In 1990, power had seeped away from the federal government to the republics and were deadlocked over the future of Yugoslavia with the Slovene and Croatian republics seeking a confederacy and Serbia a stronger federation. Gow states, "it was the behavior of Serbia that added to the Croatian and Slovene Republic's belief that no accommodation was possible with the Serbian Republic's leadership". On 15 May 1991, the outgoing Serb president of the collective presidency along with the Serb satellites on the presidency blocked the succession of the Croatian representative Stjepan Mesić as president. According to Gow, from this point on Yugoslavia de facto "ceased to function".

=== Virovitica–Karlovac–Karlobag line ===
The Virovitica–Karlovac–Karlobag line (Serbian: Вировитица–Карловац–Карлобаг линија / Virovitica–Karlovac–Karlobag linija) is a hypothetical boundary that describes the western extent of an irredentist nationalist Serbian state. It defines everything east of this line, Karlobag–Ogulin–Karlovac–Virovitica, as a part of Serbia, while the west of it would be within Slovenia, and all which might remain of Croatia. Such a boundary would give the majority of the territory of the Socialist Federal Republic of Yugoslavia to the Serbs.

This line was frequently referenced by Serbian politician Vojislav Šešelj.

A greater Serbian state was supported for irredentist as well as economical reasons, as it would give Serbia a large coastline, heavy industries, agricultural farmland, natural resources and all of the crude oil (mostly found in the Pannonian Plain, and particularly in the Socialist Republic of Croatia). There were various Serbian politicians associated with Slobodan Milošević in the early 1990s who publicly espoused such views: Mihalj Kertes, Milan Babić, Milan Martić, Vojislav Šešelj, Stevan Mirković.

=== Yugoslav wars ===
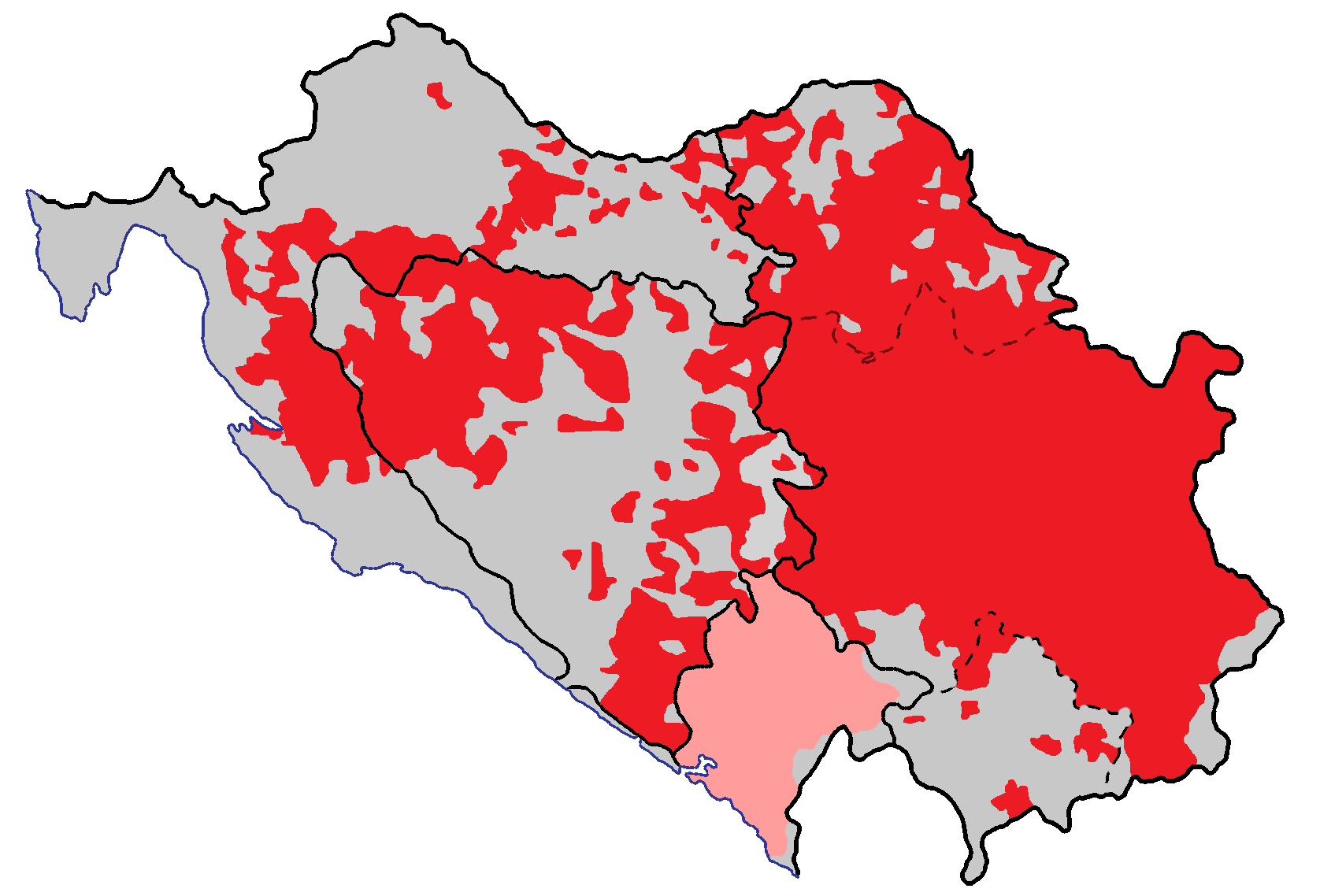
The distribution of Serbs and Montenegrins in Yugoslavia in 1981.

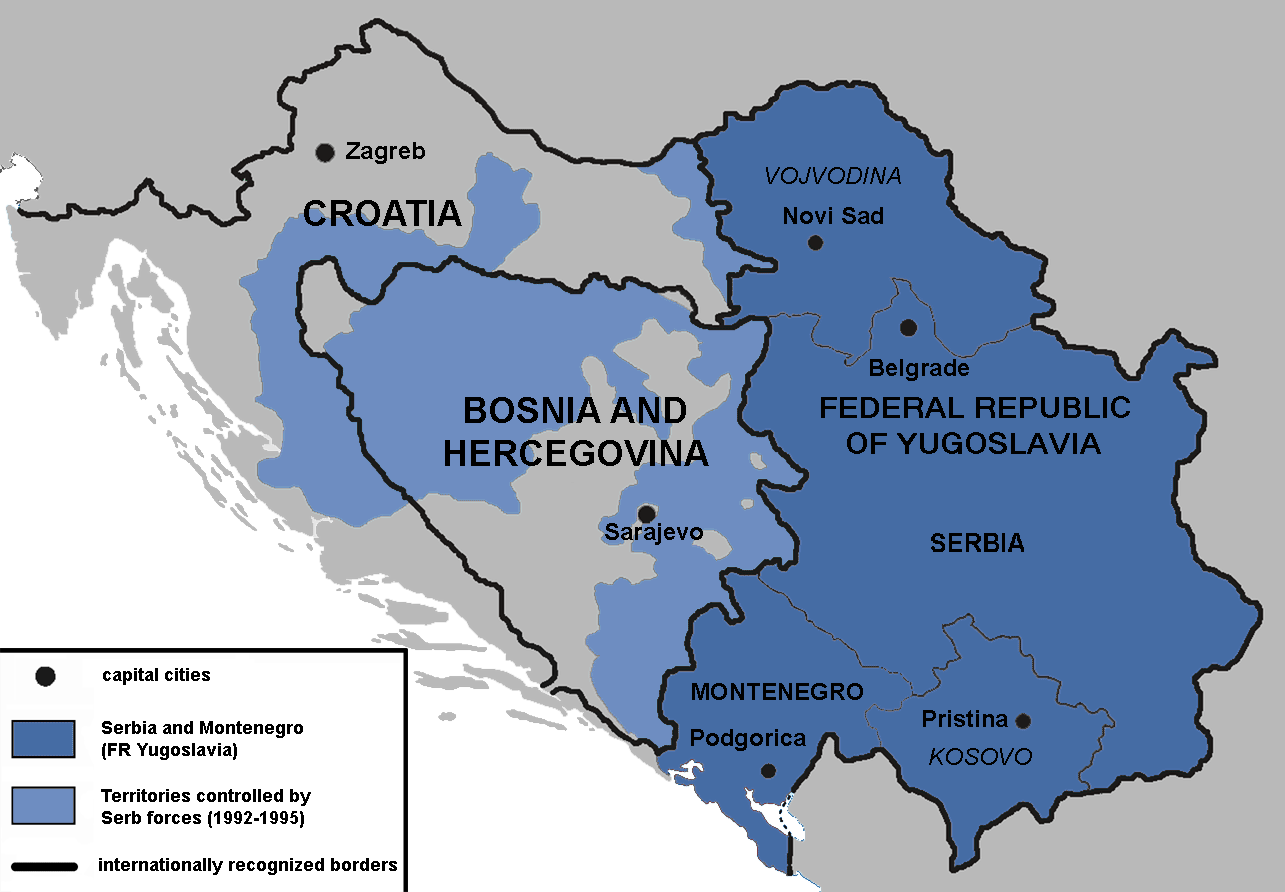
Territories of the Republic of Bosnia and Herzegovina and the Republic of Croatia controlled by Serb forces 1992–1995.

Milošević believes he now has the historic opportunity to, once and for all, settle accounts with the Croats and do what Serbian politicians after World War I did not – rally all Serbs in one Serbian state.

— Belgrade newspaper Borba, August 1991.

The war crimes charges against Milošević are based on the allegation that he sought the establishment of a "Greater Serbia". Prosecutors at the Hague argued that "the indictments were all part of a common scheme, strategy or plan on the part of the accused [Milošević] to create a 'Greater Serbia', a centralized Serbian state encompassing the Serb-populated areas of Croatia and Bosnia and all of Kosovo, and that this plan was to be achieved by forcibly removing non-Serbs from large geographical areas through the commission of the crimes charged in the indictments. Although the events in Kosovo were separated from those in Croatia and Bosnia by more than three years, they were no more than a continuation of that plan, and they could only be understood completely by reference to what had happened in Croatia and Bosnia."

The Hague Trial Chamber found that the strategic plan of the Bosnian Serb leadership consisted of "a plan to link Serb-populated areas in BiH together, to gain control over these areas and to create a separate Bosnian Serb state, from which most non-Serbs would be permanently removed". It also found that media in certain areas focused only on Serb Democratic Party policy and reports from Belgrade became more prominent, including the presentation of extremist views and promotion of the concept of a Greater Serbia, just as in other parts of Bosnia and Herzegovina the concept of a Greater Croatia was openly advocated.

Vuk Drašković, leader of the Serbian Renewal Movement, called for the creation of a Greater Serbia which would include Serbia, Kosovo, Vojvodina, North Macedonia and Montenegro, as well as regions within Bosnia and Herzegovina and Croatia with high concentrations of Serbs. About 160,000 Croats were expelled from territories Serbian forces sought to control.

Much of the fighting in the Yugoslav Wars of the 1990s was the result of an attempt to keep Serbs unified. Mihailo Marković, the Vice President of the Main Committee of Serbia's Socialist Party, rejected any solution that would make Serbs outside Serbia a minority. He proposed establishing a federation consisting of Serbia, Montenegro, Bosnia and Herzegovina, Macedonia and Serbs residing in the Serbian Autonomous Region of Krajina, Slavonia, Baranja, and Srem.

=== Later developments ===
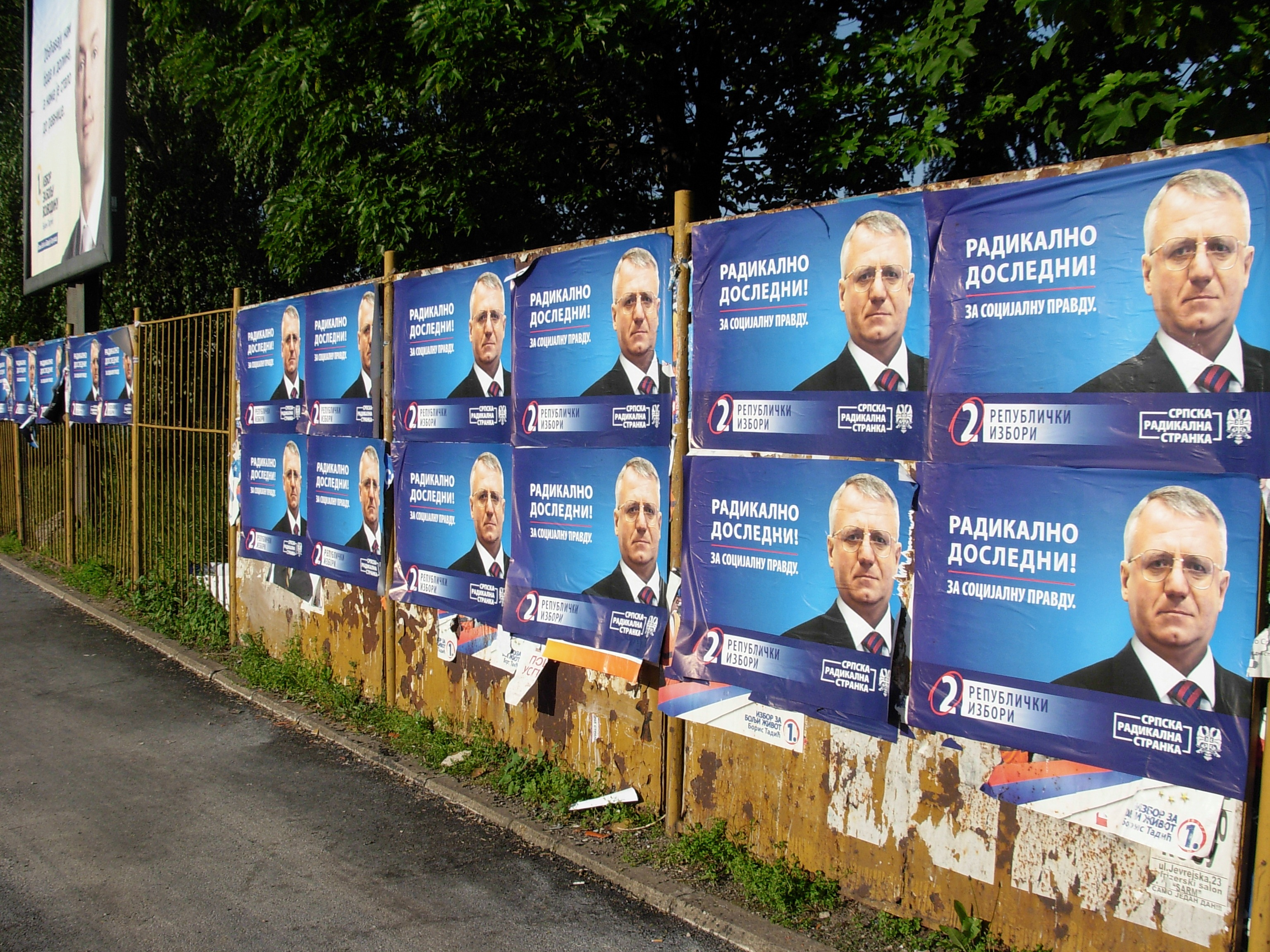
Vojislav Šešelj, president of the Serbian Radical Party, is one of the staunchest advocates of Greater Serbia.

So I say: if a Greater Serbia should be held by committing crime, I would never accept it; may Greater Serbia disappear, but to hold it by crime – no. If it were necessary to hold only a small Serbia by crime, I would not accept it. May small Serbia disappear, but to hold it by crime – no. And if there is only one Serb, and if I am that last Serb, to hold on by crime – I do not accept. May we disappear, but disappear as humans, because then we will not disappear, we will be alive in the hands of the living God.

— Serbian Patriarch Pavle

The International Criminal Tribunal for the Former Yugoslavia (ICTY) accused Slobodan Milošević and other Serb leaders of committing crimes against humanity which included murder, forcible population transfer, deportation and "persecution on political, racial or religious grounds." Tribunal prosecutor's office has accused Milosevic of "the gravest violations of human rights in Europe since the Second World War and genocide."

Serbian historian Sima Ćirković stated that grumblings about Greater Serbia and pointing fingers at Garašanin's Načertanije and the Memorandum is not helping to solve the existing problems and that it is an abuse of history.

Serbian academic Čedomir Popov considers that the allegations of "Greater Serbian intentions" are often used for politically anti-Serbian interests and that they are factually incorrect. Popov stated that throughout the Serbian history there never was nor ever will be a Greater Serbia.

In 2008, Aleksandar Vučić, a former member of the Serbian Radical Party, which advocated the creation of a Greater Serbia, stated that Šešelj's vision of Greater Serbian was unrealistic and that idea of Greater Serbia was unrealistic at the moment because of balance of power held by the great powers.

== Recent events ==
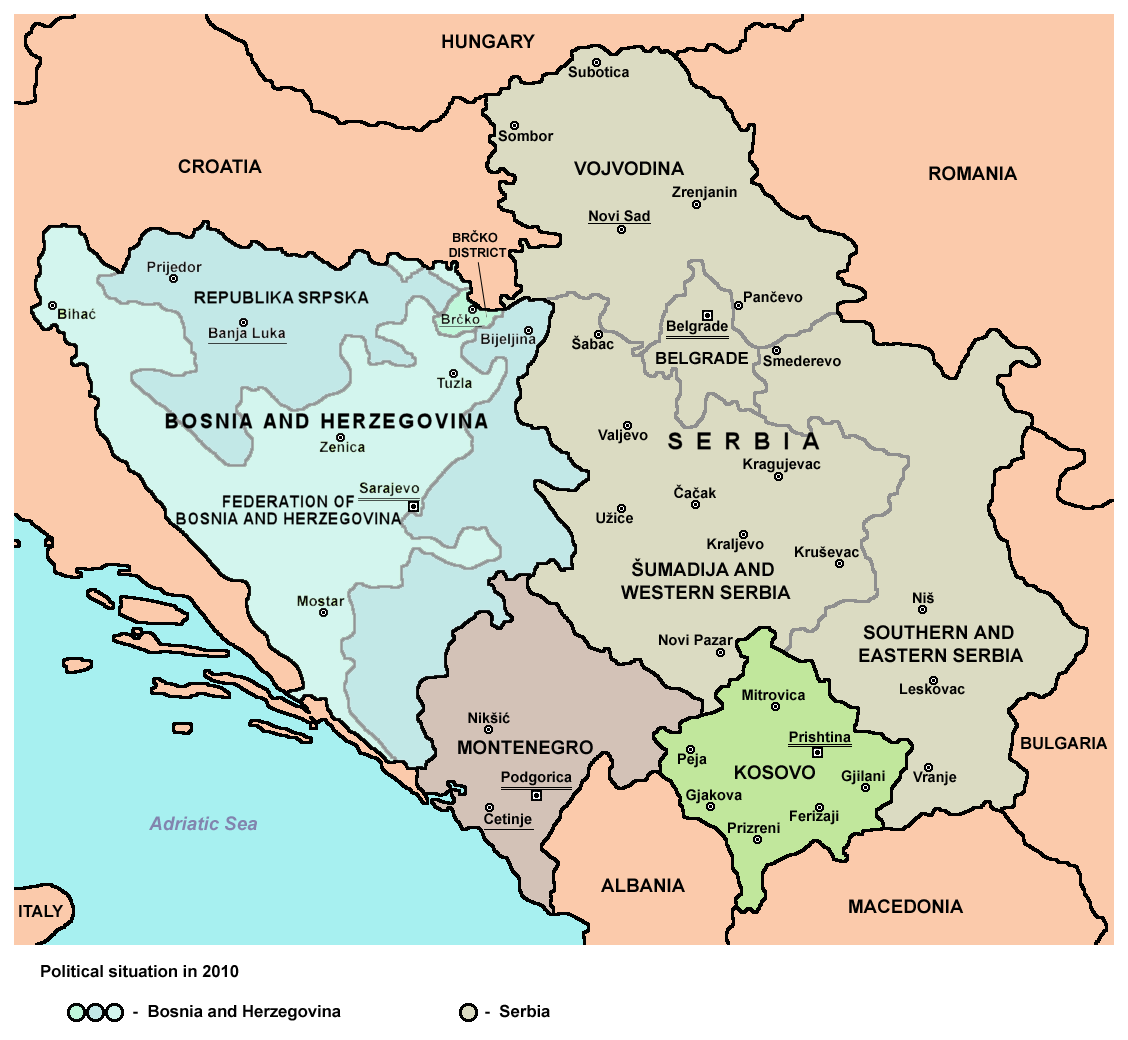
Central and eastern region of the former Yugoslavia (Republika Srpska shown in darker blue)

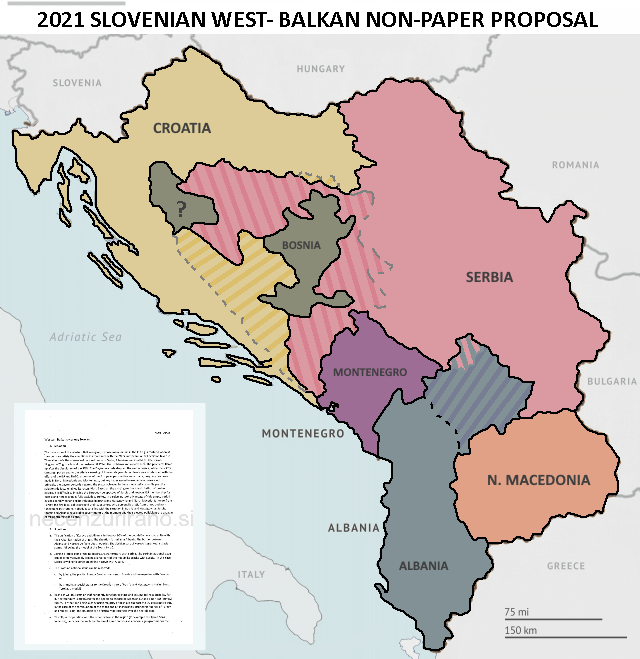
Map of the Western Balkans according to the first non-paper

In 2011, there was a movement calling for the unification of Republika Srpska with Serbia. This idea is detested by the Federation of Bosnia and Herzegovina where it is seen as an act of breaking the Dayton Agreement, while Serbs see it as an example of self-determination.

The 2021 Balkan non-papers, were two documents of unknown origin, with several sources claiming that they had been drafted by the government of Slovenia. The first non-paper called for the "peaceful dissolution" of Bosnia and Herzegovina with the annexation of Republika Srpska and great parts of Herzegovina and Central Bosnia into a Greater Serbia and Greater Croatia, leaving a small Bosniak state in what is central and western Bosnia.

=== Serbian world ===
Since 2020, a new term "Serbian world" (Serbian: Srpski svet) has come to use among prominent Serbian politicians such as Aleksandar Vulin. Some authors maintain the idea that the "Serbian world" is a copy of, or at least analogous to, the more notable "Russian world". In November 2024, Vulin (as deputy prime minister) claimed that "the process of creating a "Serbian world", the process of unification, had begun". Several regional media outlets and political commentators interpreted the term as a replacement for the earlier concept of "Greater Serbia". Earlier in June 2024, Serbian President Aleksandar Vučić had hosted the Pan-Serb Assembly in Belgrade, bringing together representatives of Serbs from across the former Yugoslavia. According to political scientist Alexander Rhotert, who quotes Vulin, the main objective of the assembly was to execute the strategic goal of the "Serbian world", the creation of a "political and state territory" on which all Serbs would live and which would be a somewhat smaller version of Greater Serbia. The assembly produced the "General Serbian Declaration", a document asserting Kosovo as part of Serbia and Republika Srpska as a "national interest of Serbia".

== See also ==
- Anti-Croat sentiment
- Anti-Serb sentiment
- Far-right politics in Serbia
- Greater Albania
- Greater Bosnia
- Greater Croatia
- Proposed secession of Republika Srpska
- Serbianisation
- Serbian nationalism
- Homogenous Serbia

== Literature ==
- Antić, Čedomir (January 2, 2010). "Kratko slavlje u Draču" [Short celebration in Durres]. Večernje Novosti (in Serbian).
- Anzulovic, Branimir (1999). Heavenly Serbia: From Myth to Genocide. New York University Press. ISBN 0-8147-0671-1.
- Banac, Ivo (1992). "The Fearful Asymmetry of War: The Causes and Consequences of Yugoslavia's Demise". Daedalus. 121 (2). MIT Press on behalf of American Academy of Arts & Sciences: 141–174. JSTOR 20025437.
- Banac, Ivo (2015) [1988]. The National Question in Yugoslavia: Origins, History, Politics. Cornell University Press. ISBN 978-1-5017-0193-1.
- Banac, Ivo (1988). Nacionalno pitanje u Jugoslaviji: porijeklo, povijest, politika. Globus. ISBN 978-86-343-0237-0.
- Clark, Christopher (2013-03-19) [2012]. The Sleepwalkers: How Europe Went to War in 1914. Harper Collins. ISBN 978-0-06-219922-5.
- Cohen, Philip J. (1996). Serbia's Secret War: Propaganda and the Deceit of History. Texas A&M University Press. ISBN 978-0-89096-760-7.
- Dizdar, Zdravko (2007). "Virovitica u planovima velikosrpske politike tijekom 19. i 20. stoljeća: od ideje do pokušaja provedbe". Scrinia Slavonica. 7 (1). Croatian Historical Institute: 263–327.
- Dizdar, Zdravko (2009). "Velikosrpska politika prema Lici u 19. i 20. stoljeću" (PDF). Identitet Like: korijeni i razvitak. Zagreb, Gospić: Institut društvenih znanosti Ivo Pilar. pp. 615–702. ISBN 978-953-6666-65-2.
- Manetovic, Edislav (2006). "Ilija Garasanin: Nacertanije and Nationalism". The Historical Review/La Revue Historique. 3: 137–173. doi:10.12681/hr.201.
- Melichárek, Maroš (2015). "The role of Vuk. S. Karadžić in the history of Serbian nationalism". Serbian Studies Research. 6 (1): 55–74.
- Pavlowitch, Stevan K. (2003b). "Serbia, Montenegro and Yugoslavia". In Djokić, Dejan (ed.). Yugoslavism: Histories of a Failed Idea, 1918-1992. London: C. Hurst & Co. pp. 57–70. ISBN 1-85065-663-0.
- Popov, Čedomir (2007). Velika Srbija: stvarnost i mit. Izd. Knjižarnica Zorana Stojanovića. ISBN 978-86-7543-123-7.
- Pinson, Mark, ed. (1996). The Muslims of Bosnia-Herzegovina: Their Historic Development from the Middle Ages to the Dissolution of Yugoslavia. Harvard Middle Eastern Monographs. Vol. XXVIII. Harvard University Press. ISBN 978-0-932885-12-8.
- Ramet, Sabrina P. (2006). The Three Yugoslavias: State-Building and Legitimation, 1918–2005. Bloomington, IN: Indiana University Press. ISBN 978-0-253-34656-8.
- Tomasevich, Jozo (1975). War and Revolution in Yugoslavia, 1941–1945: The Chetniks. Stanford: Stanford University Press. ISBN 978-0-8047-0857-9.
- Tomasevich, Jozo (2001). War and Revolution in Yugoslavia: 1941–1945. Stanford University Press. ISBN 978-0-8047-7924-1.
- Trencsenyi, Balazs; Kopecek, Michal (2007). National Romanticism: The Formation of National Movements: Discourses of Collective Identity in Central and Southeast Europe 1770–1945, volume II. Budapest: Central European University Press. ISBN 978-9-637-32660-8.
- Velikonja, Mitja (2003). Religious Separation and Political Intolerance in Bosnia-Herzegovina. Texas A&M University Press. ISBN 978-1-58544-226-3.
- Sinisa Malesevic (11 January 2013). Ideology, Legitimacy and the New State: Yugoslavia, Serbia and Croatia. Routledge. ISBN 978-1-136-34176-2.
- Charles Jelavich (1983). Serbian textbooks: toward greater Serbia or Yugoslavia.
- Svetozar Marković (1872), Serbija na istoku (Serbia in the East), Novi Sad
