= Antim Zepos =

- Metropolitan of Užice-Valjevo
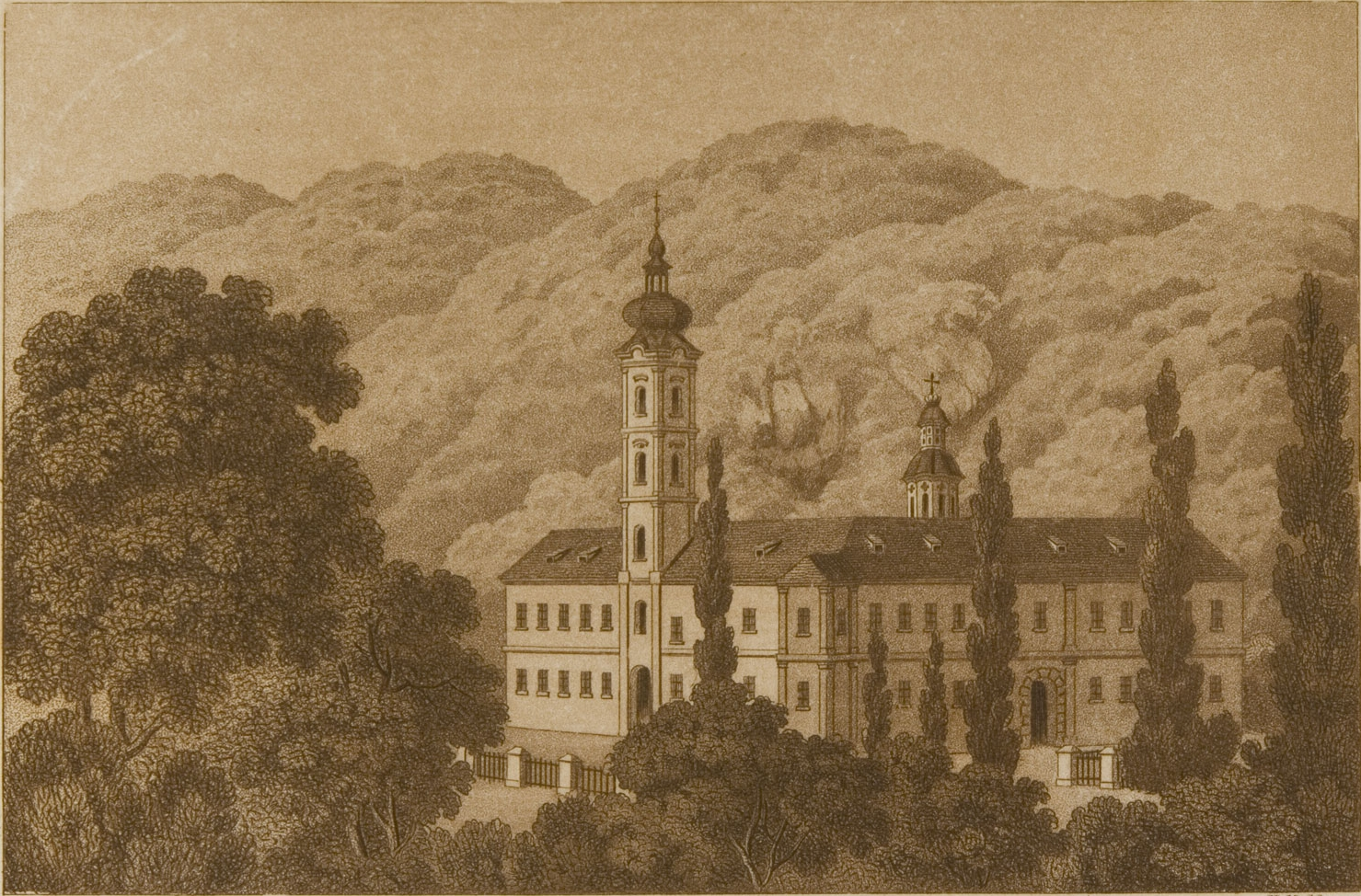
- Antim Zepos stayed at Bešenovo, outside his jurisdiction, for the most part of his tenure due to the uprising and sickness
- Church: Ecumenical Patriarchate
- Province: Sanjak of Smederevo
- Metropolis: Užice-Valjevo
- Installed: 1802
- Term ended: October 1814
- Predecessor: Danilo I
- Successor: Danilo II
- Other post: protosynkellos of the Heraklion Metropolitanate (before 1802)

Orders
- Rank: Metropolitan

Personal details
- Born: Anthimos Zepos; 1762 Mykonos, Ottoman Empire
- Died: after October 1814 Ottoman Empire
- Denomination: Eastern Orthodox
- Residence: Šabac (1804–06); Bešenovo (1806–14)

Antim Zepos (Greek: Άνθιμος Ζέπος, Serbian: Антим Зепос, 1762–after 1814) was the Metropolitan of Užice-Valjevo (1802–14) during the period of unrest in the Belgrade Pashalik, being witness to the Dahije tyranny in the pashalik and the First Serbian Uprising (1804–13). As opposed to other Greek Patriarchal bishops, Zepos supported the Serbian rebels and encouraged them to fight. After fleeing to the Habsburg Monarchy and becoming ill, he slowly distanced himself from the Serbian insurgents. The Serbian leadership planned for him to be appointed Serbian Metropolitan but this failed. Zepos resigned in October 1814 after which his fate is unknown. He was remembered positively by the Serbian people.

== Life ==
Zepos was an ethnic Greek born on Mykonos in 1762. He was the protosynkellos of the Heraklion Metropolitanate prior to succeeding Danilo as Metropolitan of Užice-Valjevo in 1802, Danilo being transferred to the Tarnovo Metropolitanate by the Ecumenical Patriarchate. His predecessor Danilo had moved the seat of the Metropolitanate from Valjevo to Šabac, so all three were found in titles. Zepos signed his title as "bishop of Šabac" or "bishop of Užice". At first, the liturgy was made in Greek until he learned Serbian. He himself Serbianized his surname to Zepović (Зеповић). In 1803 Patriarch Kallinikos V ordered Zepos to remove superstitious beliefs common among the Serbian people, upon which Zepos ordained a greater number of priests. The local clergy and people quickly came to like and respect him, and archpriest Matija Nenadović wrote about him in his memoirs, commenting that he was "a Greek, but a holy soul", and also compared him with the Metropolitan of Belgrade Leontius who "was not as our holy Antim of Valjevo". These two were the bishops in the Belgrade Pashalik, both Greeks.

=== Serbian Uprising ===
Zepos came to the Belgrade Pashalik at an insecure moment, when the Dahije (renegade Janissaries) had usurped power after capturing and murdering Vizier Hadji Mustafa Pasha and increasingly violently pressured the Serbs and desecrated churches. He witnessed the Slaughter of the Knezes (January 1804), in which Serb community leaders (including Nenadović's father Aleksa) and clergymen were murdered. Upon the outbreak of uprising, Zepos actively supported the Serbian rebels. Zepos found himself in a terrible situation where the Janissaries terrorized Šabac in March, having burnt down 155 Christian houses, killed part of the Serb population in the town, including several clergymen, one which was Zepos' protosynkellos "cut into pieces", and also assaulted Zepos who was held hostage. Despite his delicate position in Ottoman-Serbian relations and belonging to the Ecumenical Patriarchate, he stood by the Serbian people, for which he earned the respect of the Serbian leadership and the spiritual leader of Habsburg Serbs, Metropolitan Stefan Stratimirović. When Stratimirović received news of the situation he asked archpriest Matija Nenadović to save Zepos, as Zepos had done everything to protect his community. Leontius and Zepos both left for the Habsburg Monarchy in April 1804 to stay out of danger, being safe in Habsburg Zemun, and Stratimirović was informed on 25 May 1804 that both were ready to return to Serbia. On 16 June 1804 the two are mentioned as staying at the Serbian rebel base at Topčider. After an agreement with the "Turks", the situation in Šabac calmed down and Zepos returned to the town. The Serbian rebels had full trust in him by now. The uprising was subsequently turned against the Ottoman Empire after the Serbian rebels defeated and then murdered the Dahije leaders in August 1804, becoming a national uprising.

Zepos was part of the organization of the Bogovađa Monastery assembly in August 1805 that was to proclaim Karađorđe the "leader of the Serbian people" and at the same time establish the Governing Council to care for political, administrative and judicial affairs and to determine Karađorđe's role and rights. Zepos was to cense Karađorđe. Some 1,000 representatives of Valjevo, Rudnik and Belgrade nahiye arrived but the assembly was never held there. Karađorđe instead chose to have an assembly at Borak (thereby suppressing opposition), where Zepos arrived with 300 followers. The assembly discussed issues, taxes, arming insurgents and buying ammunition, and chose the members for the Governing Council. Metropolitan Leontius was not invited, which points to distrust, while the rebels had full faith in Zepos, which he earned. The Governing Council began its work at the Voljavča Monastery and was then transferred to Bogovađa. In 1805 Zepos allowed priest and vojvoda (general) Luka Lazarević to be relieved of his spiritual duties and marry for a second time (he was a widow), also being his best man (kum) at the wedding.

He was part of the delegation in Habsburg Klenak in January 1806 where talks with the Ottoman garrison of Šabac regarding a handover were held, but failed. At the beginning of 1806 Zepos stayed in his eparchy and rallied the people of Mačva to join the uprising, which was outside his spiritual mission and could become problematic for the Patriarchate, while the Ottomans tried to capture him. When the Ottomans entered Mačva in late January, Zepos fled with numerous refugees to Syrmia. Stratimirović was informed about the events. Zepos' brother and maternal nephew were in Sremska Mitrovica at the time, his brother being seriously ill and his nephew going to a Serbian school. He asked Stratimirović and the Austrian general-command to let him be quarantined in Mitrovica "until the Serbs on that side resist the Turks".

=== Exile in the Habsburg Monarchy ===
Stratimirović secured his stay in the Habsburg Monarchy. Onwards, Zepos informed Stratimirović on the events in the Pashalik and Serb victories, such as the important Battle of Mišar. When the Austrian authorities pressured him to leave Mitrovica (as to rid any responsibility), Stratimirović gave him the options of staying at Sremski Karlovci, Bešenovo or Šišatovac Monastery at Fruška Gora, and Zepos chose Bešenovo, moving with his entourage in October 1806. In the meantime, the Serbian rebels had several victories and the Ottoman army on the fronts was in a bad state.

The Serbs took over Belgrade on 26 December 1806 and the last Ottoman garrison, at Užice, capitulated on 15 July 1807. The Ottoman Empire had also declared war on Russia on 12 December 1806. An Ottoman Vizier order dated 13 July 1807 calls upon the earlier fatwah to violently subdue the Serbian rebels, and includes orders for the destruction "of that group", taking of their property, imprisonment and enslaving their women and children. Serbs had endured this kind of retribution in the 17th- and 18th centuries following revolts, and areas in western and central Serbia, and Kosovo, had been depopulated due to this. Zepos returned to Serbia in July 1807 but stayed only briefly. Stratimirović issued a certificate to Zepos on 25 July 1807 that included his flight with refugees, his honourable ways and support to the people. Zepos became sick with scurvy, vitamin-deficiency, and was too weak for duty.

Due to the situation the Porte forced the Ecumenical Patriarchate to be an intermediate (under Ottoman control) between the Serbian rebels and the Porte. In November 1807 Metropolitan Leontius was authorized to promise the Serbs their demands if they swore loyalty to the Ottoman sultan. The Serbs refused, banished Metropolitan Aksentios of Kyustendil (sent there to accompany Leontius in this mission) and threatened Leontius. In April 1808 Stratimirović was informed of a pardon (amnesty) for Metropolitan Zepos to return to his eparchy sent by Metropolitan Kalinik of Dabar-Bosnia through Venedikt Kraljević, surely with Ottoman knowing. From this time on, Zepos distanced himself more and more from the Serbian leadership and only sporadically went to Serbia. Leontius de facto took over his administration, as seen in his usage of the title "Serbian Metropolitan". In October 1808 Mulla Pasha of Vidin and Metropolitan Dionysios of Vidin met with Leontius, Stevan Živković-Telemak and Russian envoy Konstantin Rodofinikin in Poreč in eastern Serbia and discussed an ending to the conflict through diplomatic means, at first without informing the Serbian leadership.

In August 1809 Leontius left Serbia with Russian envoy Rodofinikin, due to disagreements with the Serbian leadership. Serbia was now left without bishops, leading the Serbian leadership to look to have archimandrite and vojvoda Melentije Stevanović ordained a bishop via Russia, but this failed several times. In July 1810 the Serbian leadership uncanonically proclaimed Melentije a metropolitan vicar. Leontius was allowed to return to Serbia but sickness made him put Melentije as his representative (as "administrator of all Serbia") later that year. In 1811, the Serbian leadership sent Melentije to Wallachia to ask to be ordained as bishop of the two eparchies in Serbian territory, but this was denied again, as against Ottoman interest, against the Ecumenical Patriarchate, and uncanonical. Melentije continued to serve as the de facto metropolitan, at the same time being a military commander. It is believed that the Serbian leadership sought help from Stratimirović to appoint Zepos as Serbian Metropolitan, and Melentije as Metropolitan of Užice-Valjevo. Due to the uncanonical reasons, Stratimirović likely gave up on this. In a letter dated 22 February 1812, Karađorđe asked Stratimirović to ensure with the Austrian authorities that Zepos could return as soon as possible to Serbia. During this time, Zepos met with Karađorđe at Topola regarding proclaiming Zepos the Serbian Metropolitan and he was to return for further talks, but Zepos never returned to Serbia after this. Zepos likely was unwilling to go against the Ecumenical Patriarchate in this matter as it was uncanonical and there were no prerequisites for an autonomous Serbian church (the war was ongoing and Serbia was not recognized as a specific territory as was the Danubian Principalities).

With the suppression of the Serbian Uprising in 1813, general amnesty was given by the Porte in November 1813 to the rebels and surely to Zepos. He stayed at his position until October 1814, being mentioned as having resigned voluntarily. He was succeeded by Danilo II who was remembered negatively for overcharging the community, for which he was dethroned and sentenced to serve as an ordinary monk at Meteora. The fate of Zepos is unknown, but he is believed to have retired to Constantinople or the Greek provinces.

Zepos' portrait was painted in 1811 at Sremski Karlovci and then held at Bešenovo until World War II.

== Annotations ==
1. The Serbian Patriarchate of Peć was abolished by the Ottoman Empire in 1766. The Ecumenical Patriarchate of Constantinople gained Serb-inhabited territories upon which mostly Greek bishops were ordained. The Ecumenical Patriarchate was the representative of all Orthodox Christians in the empire (the Rum Millet). Most of these bishops had difficulties in adjusting in the new ethnic surroundings and sought to be transferred to Greek eparchies as soon as possible, using their tenure for material gain in order to accomplish this. Some negative individuals stained the reputation of all Greek ("Phanariote") bishops among the people and in historiography. Zepos was not one of these. Some Greek bishops viewed the Serbs as their herd, for which they were responsible towards God. Zepos called the Serbian rebels "ours" in his correspondence with Stratimirović. Most of the bishops of the Metropolitanate of Užice-Valjevo were remembered as good and honourable.
2. Leontius is remembered negatively in Serbian historiography. He is known to have "played both sides" and is alleged to have been involved in the murders of several people, including having Mustafa Pasha kill his mentor and predecessor Metropolitan Methodios, taking his seat, and giving up archimandrite Hadži-Ruvim to the Dahije. Matija Nenadović wrote in his memoirs that Karađorđe hated Leontius "as the worst Turk" for working in Ottoman interest. The Serbian leadership were untrusting and reserved towards him. The Ecumenical Patriarchate was forced to be an intermediate between the Serbian rebels and the Porte. Leontius is alleged to have confessed about the murder of Methodios on his deathbed, but it was later proved that the Dahije had him killed, as was done with Mustafa Pasha soon afterwards.

== Sources ==
- Kašić, Dušan Lj. (1979). "Епископ шабачки Антим" (PDF). Теолошки погледи. XII (4). Свети Архијерејски Синод: 275–282.
- Milićević, Milan Đ. (1888). Поменик знаменитих људи у српског народа новијега доба. Издање Чупићеве задужбине. p. 289 – via Archive.org.
- Radosavljević, Nedeljko V. (2011). "Aнтим Зепос, ужичко-ваљевски митрополит 1802-1814". Istorijski časopis. 60: 271–288 – via CEEOL.
- Radosavljević, Nedeljko (2007). Православна црква у Београдском пашалуку 1766-1831. Istorijski institut. ISBN 978-86-7743-065-8.
- Radosavljević, Nedeljko V.; Marinković, Mirjana O. (2012). "Једна османска наредба о војном уништењу Србије из 1807. године" [An Ottoman order on the military destruction of Serbia from 1807]. Истраживања. 23: 283–293.
- Sava (1996). Српски јерарси од деветог до двадесетог века. Belgrade, Podgorica: Евро; Унирекс.
- Spasović, Stanimir (1988). Uloga Srpske crkve u nacionalnom oslobođenju. Istočnik.
