= Tican's rebellion =

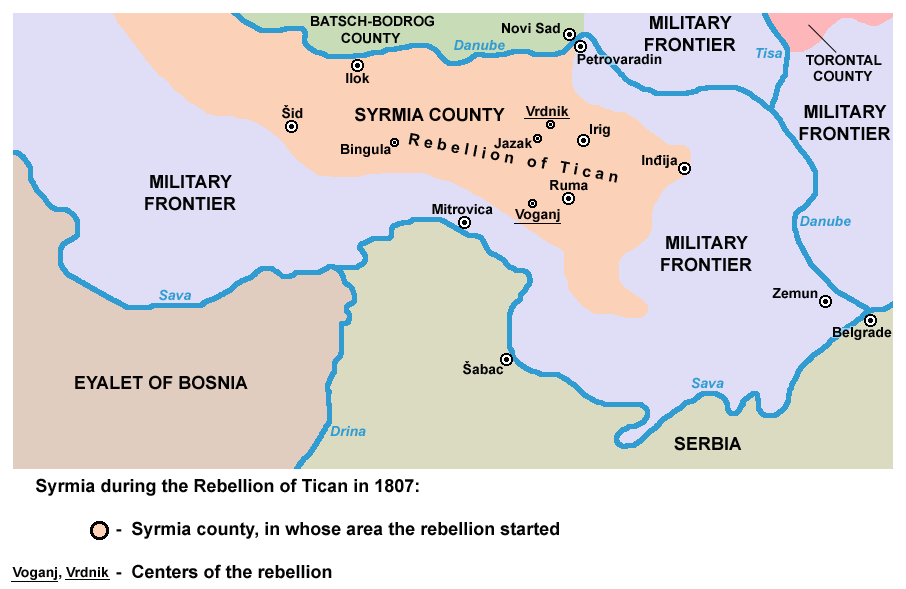
Syrmia during the Rebellion of Tican in 1807

The Tican's rebellion (Serbian: Тицанова буна or Ticanova buna) was a rebellion of the Syrmian peasants against feudal relations in society. The rebellion started in April 1807 on the estate of Ruma of earl Karlo Pejačević (who was also the prefect of Syrmia county) and estate of Ilok of earl Odescalchi. The reason for the rebellion was large increase of feudal tributes and dissatisfaction because of land regulation.

Tican's Rebellion included 15,000 Serb peasants from 45 villages and the center of the rebellion was in the village of Voganj near Ruma. From this village, on April 3, the Syrmian rebels sent a proclamations about rebellion. The leaders of the rebellion were Teodor Avramović Voganjac (local knez - the head of the village), Andrija Popović (teacher), Pantelija Ostojić and Marko Ognjanović. However, the rebellion was named after Teodor Avramović Tican from village of Jazak, one of the leaders of the rebellion, who advocated uncompromised fight against sipahi (feudal lords) and church oligarchy.

== Teodor Avramović Tican ==
Teodor Avramović (nickname Tican, 1767 - 1810) was a prince and leader of the rebellion in Srem.

He grew up in a poor peasant family in the Srem village of Jazak. Because of his "quickness and agility" and small stature in his youth, he was nicknamed Tican. He was educated; he also finished the German school in Zemun. He was a soldier in the regiment of Baron Jelačić for 17 years, and he took part in the Napoleonic Wars

== Results ==
The rebellion was suppressed on April 9 near Bingula, but its final end was on April 14. The Austrian authorities used troops almost amounting to the strength of an army to fight the rebels. The Orthodox priests led by metropolitan Stefan Stratimirović also helped in suppression of the rebellion. After the rebellion was suppressed, the amnesty was proclaimed for most rebels except for Tican, who was sentenced to death by torture on the wheel.

However, because of the Napoleonic Wars and war between Serbs and Ottomans in Karađorđe's Serbia, the Austrian authorities were forced to be lenient towards peasant rebels in Syrmia and Slavonia from several rebellions during 1806–1808, thus, in 1810, the authorities forced feudal lords to stop excessive exploitation of their peasants. Memory about Tican, the leader of the rebellion, is kept alive in people's tradition until the present day.

== See also ==
- History of Serbia
- History of Vojvodina
- Syrmia

== Sources ==
- Dr. Dušan J. Popović, Srbi u Vojvodini, knjiga treća, Novi Sad, 1990.
- Enciklopedija Jugoslavije, vol. 8 (Srbija, Ž), Yugoslav Lexicographical Institute, Zagreb, 1971.
- Mala enciklopedija Prosvete (M–Š), Prosveta, Beograd, 1969.
