= Jazak =

Jazak Јазак (Serbian)
- Village (Selo)
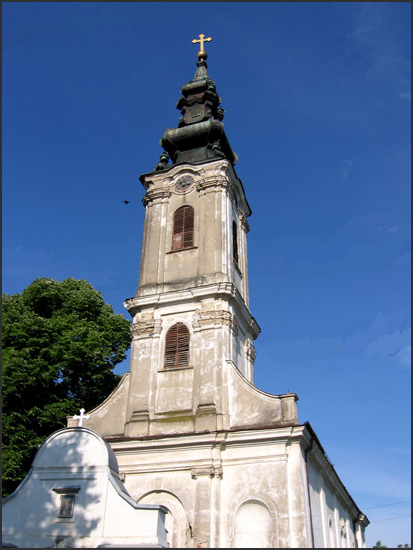
- Serbian Orthodox church

- Location within Vojvodina Location within Serbia Location within Europe
- Coordinates: 45°06′16″N 19°46′01″E
- Country: Serbia
- Province: Vojvodina
- District: Syrmia
- Municipality: Irig

Population (2002)
  - Total: 1,100
- Time zone: UTC+1 (CET)
  - Summer (DST): UTC+2 (CEST)
- Postal code: 22409
- Area code: +381 22
- Vehicle registration: SM

Jazak (Serbian Cyrillic: Јазак) is a village in Serbia. It is located in the Irig municipality, in the region of Syrmia (Syrmia District), Vojvodina province. According to the 2002 census, the village had a population of 1,100, of whom 1,045 were ethnic Serbs.

== Historical population ==
Historical population
Year	Pop.	±%
1961	1,587	—
1971	1,478	−6.9%
1981	1,303	−11.8%
1991	1,144	−12.2%
2002	1,100	−3.8%

== Notable residents ==
- Teodor Avramović, the leader of the rebellion of the Syrmian peasants, which was known as the Tican's Rebellion.

== Church of St. Nicholas ==
The Serbian Orthodox Church of St. Nicholas dates back to the 18th century. The ornamental church work is attributed to engraver Marko Vujatović.

== See also ==
- Jazak monastery
- List of places in Serbia
- List of cities, towns and villages in Vojvodina
