= Kalinik of Dabar-Bosnia =

Metropolitan of Dabar-Bosnia (1802 to 1816)

Kalinik
- Died: 1816; Constantinople
- Other name: Kallinikos
- Citizenship: Ottoman
- Occupation: bishop
- Years active: 1802–16

Kalinik (Greek: Καλλίνικος, Serbian: Калиник; fl. 1802–d. 1816) was the metropolitan of Dabar and Bosnia serving from 1802 to 1816.

Kalinik is titled Metropolitan of Bosnia in the stamp (mitrop. bosanski and year 1802) of his Greek-Serbian synkellos issued to priest Maksim Varnica in Dobroselica (in Užice) dated 30 January 1803. A firman dating 28 May 1804 decided that metropolitan Kalinik be allowed his higher fees of religious services, which the Orthodox devotees protested against. Kalinik's associates and aides were Josif, his nephew through his sister, and Venedikt Kraljević. The metropolitan of Dabar-Bosnia had under him the vicar bishop titled "metropolitan of Kratovo" in the first half of the 19th century. Kalinik appointed Kraljević as vicar bishop of Kratovo in 1805, allegedly through bribes. Kalinik remained the metropolitan by title but lived in Constantinople, while Kraljević remained in Bosnia and sent Kalinik money. Kalinik was a member of the Patriarchal Holy Synod at Constantinople. Due to "some jobs" in Constantinople (mentioned in a firman to the Sarajevo kadi dated 5 February 1808), vladika of Zvornik Evgenije was temporarily put as metropolitan of Bosnia in place of Kalinik in 1808. While Kalinik and Kraljević were friends at first, they eventually had a falling out. By the summer of 1808 Austria had most foreign influence in the Bosnia Eyalet, through the Austrian consulate in Travnik under Mitesser which was organized to counter Russian and French influence in the province and to uphold good Austro-Ottoman relations. Mitesser had worked on bribing the Ottoman Bosnian nobility and Catholic and Orthodox clergy to take a pro-Austrian stance. Austria managed to win over the Orthodox leadership in Bosnia, with Mitesser meeting with metropolitans Kalinik of Dabar-Bosnia and Joanikije of Zvornik at Travnik in October 1808. The metropolitans complained about Venedikt Kraljević and expressed their support to Austria.

Kalinik's vicar Kraljević was arrested and tortured by Ottoman authorities on the accusation of instigating a Serb rebellion in Bosnia with others. Kraljević fled Bosnia and lived in Austria and Serbia for a time, his presence in Serbia was unwanted and he was forced to leave, before settling in Dalmatia, where he was appointed bishop of Dalmatia by French general Marmont in 1810, confirmed by Napoleon on 26 March 1810. Napoleon also confirmed Gerasim Zelić as the vicar of Dalmatia (although he left that position being pensioned on 16 November 1811). In the meantime, the Dabar-Bosnia metropolitanate was resolved with appointment of Josif (1809), Kalinik's nephew, as vicar bishop and Evgenije ended his tenure there. In October 1814 Archimandrite Gerasim Zelić while staying in Vienna accused Kraljević of having an unknown or inappropriate background and having "bought the Bosnian bishopric" from Kalinik. Kalinik's nephew Josif was appointed Metropolitan of Herzegovina in 1816. Kraljević, due to Zelić's accusations and possibility of losing the Dalmatian metropolitanate to Metropolitan Stefan Stratimirović at Karlovci, began talks about Uniatism in July 1816; his subsequent support of Uniatism in Dalmatia gave him a bad reputation and legacy in the Serbian Orthodox Church.

Kalinik died in 1816. His successor Venijamin was confirmed in a berat dating 24 October 1816.

== Sources ==
- Cvjetković, Kiril; Ruvarac, Dimitrije (1898). Автобиографија протосинђела Кирила Цвјетковића: и његово страдање за православље. Državna štamparija Kraljevine Srbije. p. 263.
- Sava, Bishop of Šumadija (1996). Srpski jerarsi od devetog do dvadesetog veka. Evro.
- Radosavljević, Nedeljko V. (2019). "Gabriel of Zvornik" (PDF). Историјски часопис. LXVIII.
- Radosavljević, Nedeljko V. (2011). "ДАБРОБОСАНСКА (САРАЈЕВСКА) МИТРОПОЛИЈА У РАТНОМ ПЕРИОДУ СРПСКЕ РЕВОЛУЦИЈЕ (1804−1815)". Istraživanja. 22: 205–219.
- Radosavljević, Nedeljko V. (2013). "Vikarni episkopi Dabrobosanske mitropolije (1766–1878)". Istorijski časopis. 62: 161–192.
- Историјски часопис [Historical Journal]. Историјски часопис (in Serbian). 57. Научно дело. 2008. Историјски институт Српске академије наука и уметности.
- H. Savva (1898). Jungić, Teodor (ed.). "Pregled". источник. 12: 83–85.
- Skarić, Vladislav (1985). Izabrana djela. Veselin Masleša.
- Teinović, Bratislav (2018). "U trouglu velikih sila: Bosna i Hercegovina tokom Prvog srpskog ustanka (1804–1813)". Svarog (17). Nezavisni univerzitet Banja Luka: 43–55 – via CEEOL.
- ΔΗΜΗΤΡΙΟΥ Π. ΠΑΣΧΑΛΗ (1930), Moni Agias Eirinis (PDF), Academy of Athens

Eastern Orthodox Church titles
Preceded by Pajsije	Metropolitan of Dabar-Bosnia and Archbishop of Sarajevo; 1802–1816	Succeeded by Venijamin
