= Venedikt Kraljević =

Eastern Orthodox bishop active in Bosnia and Dalmatia (1765–1862)

Venediktos
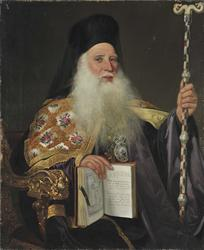
- Born: 15 January 1765; Near Thessaloniki, Ottoman Empire (now Greece)
- Died: 1 February 1862 (aged 97); Venice
- Other name: Venedikt Kraljević
- Citizenship: Ottoman; French (1810–13); Austrian (1813–23); Venetian (1823–)
- Occupation: bishop
- Years active: 1805–23

Venediktos (Greek: Βενέδικτος; 1765–1862), known in Serbian as Venedikt Kraljević (Венедикт Краљевић, Italian: Benedetto Craglievich), was an Eastern Orthodox bishop active in Bosnia and Dalmatia during the turbulent years of the First Serbian Uprising (1804–13) and the Austrian, Russian and French struggle for rule and influence in the central Balkans. He chose to support the French in 1808 and was awarded the bishopric of Dalmatia in 1810. He subsequently worked on the Uniatism of the Orthodox in Dalmatia after 1816 for which he received a bad reputation and legacy in the Serbian Orthodox Church. He was driven out of Dalmatia in 1823 and then lived in Venice. He was in talks with pro-French politicians in the Kingdom of Greece.

== Early life ==
Venediktos was born on 15 January 1765 in a village near Thessaloniki, the son of a Greek father named Christodoulos and Bulgarian (or Slavic Macedonian) mother Aleksandra. He took monastic vows in the monastery of St. Athanasios near Thessaloniki. For many years Venediktos was a wanderer, then became a protosynkellos in Bucharest and Ioannina.

He espoused a Greek identity ("I am not a Serb, but a Greek"), grew up bilingual in Greek and Bulgarian, and learnt Turkish. The Serbian byname "Kraljević" (Краљевић, Kralidis) was adopted by him later in life.

== Bosnia and Dalmatia ==
Bosnian metropolitan Kalinik appointed Venedikt as vicar "bishop of Kratovo" in 1805, allegedly through bribes. The metropolitan of Dabar-Bosnia had under him the vicar bishop titled "metropolitan of Kratovo" in the first half of the 19th century. Kalinik remained the metropolitan by title but lived in Constantinople (as member of the Patriarchal Holy Synod), while Venedikt remained in Bosnia and sent Kalinik money. Due to "some jobs" in Constantinople (mentioned in a firman to the Sarajevo kadi dated 5 February 1808), vladika of Zvornik Evgenije was temporarily put as metropolitan of Bosnia in place of Kalinik in 1808. While Kalinik and Venedikt were friends at first, they eventually had a falling out.

By the summer of 1808 Austria had most foreign influence in the Bosnia Eyalet, through the Austrian consulate in Travnik under Mitesser which was organized to counter Russian and French influence in the province and to uphold good Austro-Ottoman relations. Mitesser had worked on bribing the Ottoman Bosnian nobility and Catholic and Orthodox clergy to take a pro-Austrian stance. Austria managed to win over the Orthodox leadership in Bosnia, with Mitesser meeting with metropolitans Kalinik of Sarajevo and Joanikije of Zvornik at Travnik in October 1808. The metropolitans complained about Venedikt and expressed their support to Austria.

Kalinik's vicar Venedikt was arrested and tortured by Ottoman authorities on the accusation of instigating a Serb rebellion in Bosnia with others. Venedikt fled Bosnia and lived in the Habsburg Monarchy, staying at the Bešenovo Monastery which Metropolitan of Karlovci Stefan Stratimirović had chosen for him to reside in. The Ottoman authorities learnt of Venedikt's whereabouts and demanded of Austria that he be sent back to Bosnia, upon which he moved to Serbia for a time, however, his presence became unwanted there and he was forced to leave, now moving to Dalmatia.

The Orthodox of Dalmatia had demanded an independent bishopric, assembly (consistorium) and theological school and their demands were met by Napoleon in 1808. Since the establishment of this renewed Dalmatian eparchy (now under French rule), Venedikt worked tirelessly to be appointed the bishop of Dalmatia. During the rebellion against the French in Dalmatia (which played in Austria's favour) Venedikt chose to side with the French. When the Austrian troops entered Sebenico, Venedikt was arrested and interred at the Bezdin Monastery where he stayed until the Austrian retreat from Dalmatia. Due to his support to the French, he was appointed bishop of Dalmatia by French general Marmont in 1810, confirmed by Napoleon on 26 March 1810. The Eparchy was also adjoined by the Bay of Kotor, Pula and Peroj. Napoleon also confirmed Gerasim Zelić as the vicar of Dalmatia (although he left that position being pensioned on 16 November 1811). In 1810 Venedikt established a consistorium at Sebenico and decided for the establishment of a clergy seminarium at Sebenico. The beginning of his tenure in Dalmatia was viewed of as positive, but this changed over time. In the meantime, the Dabar-Bosnia metropolitanate was resolved with appointment of Kalinik's nephew Josif as vicar (1809).

Dalmatia became an Austrian province in 1813 and Venedikt now worked tirelessly to win over his rivals among the Orthodox leadership. He expressed his support to the Habsburg emperor and a request to acknowledge him as Dalmatian bishop was sent. At the same time, Venedikt asked Metropolitan Stefan Stratimirović to join the Dalmatian eparchy into the Metropolitanate of Karlovci, which was done in 1813. This was done despite Stratimirović viewing Venedikt as having become bishop through uncanonical measures. The Austrian court did not formally recognize Venedikt, which bothered him. In October 1814 Archimandrite Gerasim Zelić while staying in Vienna accused Venedikt of having an unknown or inappropriate background and having "bought the Bosnian bishopric" from Kalinik. Kalinik's nephew Josif was appointed Metropolitan of Herzegovina in 1816. Venedikt, due to Zelić's accusations and possibility of losing the Dalmatian metropolitanate to Metropolitan Stratimirović, began secret talks regarding Uniatism in July 1816; his subsequent support for Uniatism in Dalmatia gave him a bad reputation and legacy in the Serbian Orthodox Church.

The Austrian court only recognized Venedikt as the Dalmatian bishop following his stay at Vienna in 1818–19 when he proposed a Uniate base at Sebenico with Uniate teachers from Galicia. The Dalmatian Orthodox were alarmed and informed Metropolitan Stratimirović who took them under his wing and complained to the emperor, government and Interior Minister Metternich. The situation in Dalmatia deteriorated further following the murder of a clergyman of Stupnik on 10 June 1821. Venedikt was forced to leave the eparchy in springtime 1823 and travelled in Italy. Metropolitan Stratimirović managed to finally have Venedikt removed from Dalmatia. The Dalmatian eparchy was officially put under the Karlovci Metropolitanate with an Austrian decree dating 28 December 1828. The archimandrite of Gomirje, Josif Rajačić, became the new Dalmatian bishop.

== Later years ==
Venedikt sent letters to French Party leader Ioannis Kolettis.

Venedikt died in Venice on 1 February 1862, aged 97. In his testament, he claimed to have never been an Uniate.

== Sources ==
- Cvjetković, Kiril; Ruvarac, Dimitrije (1898). Автобиографија протосинђела Кирила Цвјетковића: и његово страдање за православље. Državna štamparija Kraljevine Srbije. p. 263.
- H. Savva (1898). Jungić, Teodor (ed.). "Pregled". источник. 12: 83–85.
- Radosavljević, Nedeljko V. (2015). "Венедикт Краљевић: прилози за биографију" (PDF). Црквене студије. 11. Niš: 353–383.
- Radosavljević, Nedeljko V. (2019). "Gabriel of Zvornik" (PDF). Историјски часопис. LXVIII.
- Sava, Bishop of Šumadija (1996). Srpski jerarsi od devetog do dvadesetog veka. Evro.
- Историјски часопис. Historical Journal (in Serbian). 57. Научно дело. 2008. Историјски институт Српске академије наука и уметности.
- Teinović, Bratislav (2018). "U trouglu velikih sila: Bosna i Hercegovina tokom Prvog srpskog ustanka (1804–1813)". Svarog (17). Nezavisni univerzitet Banja Luka: 43–55 – via CEEOL.
- Eparhija Dalmatinska. "ВЕНЕДИКТ (Краљевић) епископ далматински 1810-1823". Eparhija Dalmatinska.
