= Arsenije Gagović =

Archimandrite Arsenija Gagović (Serbian Cyrillic: Арсеније Гаговић; c. 1750-1817) is remembered as the renovator of Piva monastery and one of the major players in the liberation of Serbia from the Ottoman Empire before and during the First and Second Serbian Uprising. Folk songs and tradition speak of him among the faithful and the clergy as Arsenije Pivski, who travelled to the Holy Land.

== Biography ==
He was born in the village of Kruševo in the municipality of Piva. Members of the Gagović family are one of the oldest and most respectable families in the village of Kruševo in the municipality of Piva where Arsenije was born. The year of his birth has yet to be determined, though he played an important role in the First Serbian Uprising, maintaining the link between Karađorđe and the Herzegovinian Serbs, bordering Montenegro.

Arsenije Gagović was first mentioned in 1783 as a hieromonk of Hilandar and in 1788 when he came to Piva Monastery he found it in a sad state, razed to the ground and covered with straw. As for the fate of the Piva Monastery, after its construction, in fact, its three-year renovation (1790-1793) was the most significant. For the endeavour of rebuilding the monastery, Arsenije organized respectable individuals and people and garnered the support of the tribes of Piva, Gacko, Rudina, Nikšić and Foča. When he renovated the monastery, he travelled to Constantinople in 1794 to obtain a firman for Piva and happily brought it back with him in 1795.

In 1803, he travelled to Imperial Russia, where he presented to the Russian court a plan for the liberation of the South Slavs in the Balkans from the Turks and asked for help in opening a theological-teaching school in Piva at the same time. On his return, he stayed with Metropolitan Stevan Stratimirović of Sremski Karlovci, with whom he discussed the possibility of an uprising against the Turks. Gagović was active in the resistance movement against the Ottoman Empire on many levels, but mostly behind the scenes, corresponding with Petar I Petrović-Njegoš, Sava Tekelija, Stevan Stratimirović, Karađorđe, Bishop Jovan Jovanović of Bačka, and other Serbian leaders.

== Karađorđe's proclamation ==
In 1804, Karađorđe, together with his elders, sent a proclamation to Archimandrite Arsenije that the Serbs were rising in revolt against the Turks.

After the uprising, more precisely in 1811, Archimandrite Arsenije travelled to Russia, but the Russians, stationed in Bucharest, returned him to Herzegovina on a special mission. Then he also met with Karađorđe. Before the end of 1812, he left for Imperial Russia again, where he remained for four years. The Russian government awarded him a pension for his services, enough funds to repair the monastery of Piva and liturgical books that were a premium in Serbia. Archimandrite Arsenije was last mentioned on 17 March 1817, when he was in Odessa. It is believed that on his return home he was captured at Mostar and killed there that same year.

== Death ==
An entry in the Chronicle of the Piva Monastery speaks about the death of Arsenije Gagović:

In 1816, he went to Russia, submitted a request to Tsar Alexander I and transferred the right to the imperial help of Piva and all the books, and that right lasted for Piva until the downfall of Tsar Nikola from the Bolsheviks. He returns from there via Mount Athos, he comes to Piva, where he gets permits from the Vizier, in Travnik, he spots danger to himself while still in Travnik; he sends the permits secretly by handing them to a young courier on a detour, and a day later he leaves and on his way is killed by Turks - the year and date are not recorded.

== Sources ==
- Milan Đ. Milićević, Pomenik znamenitih ljudi u srpskog narodu novijega doba, Vol 1 (Belgrade, 1888)
- Milan Đ. Milićević,Kneževina Srbija (Belgrade, 1878)
- Lazar Arsenijević Batalaka, Istorija srpskog ustanka (Belgrade, 1898)
- Konstantin N. Nenadović, Život i dela velikog Đorđa Petrovića Kara Đorđa Vrhovnog Vožda... (Vienna, 1884)

== Literature ==
- Kosta Radović, Arhimandrit Arsenije Gagović i duhovnost Pive ("Archimandrite Arsenije Gagović and the Spirituality of Piva")
