= Stefan Stratimirović =

Serbian Orthodox metropolitan bishop (1757–1836)

- Metropolitan of Karlovci
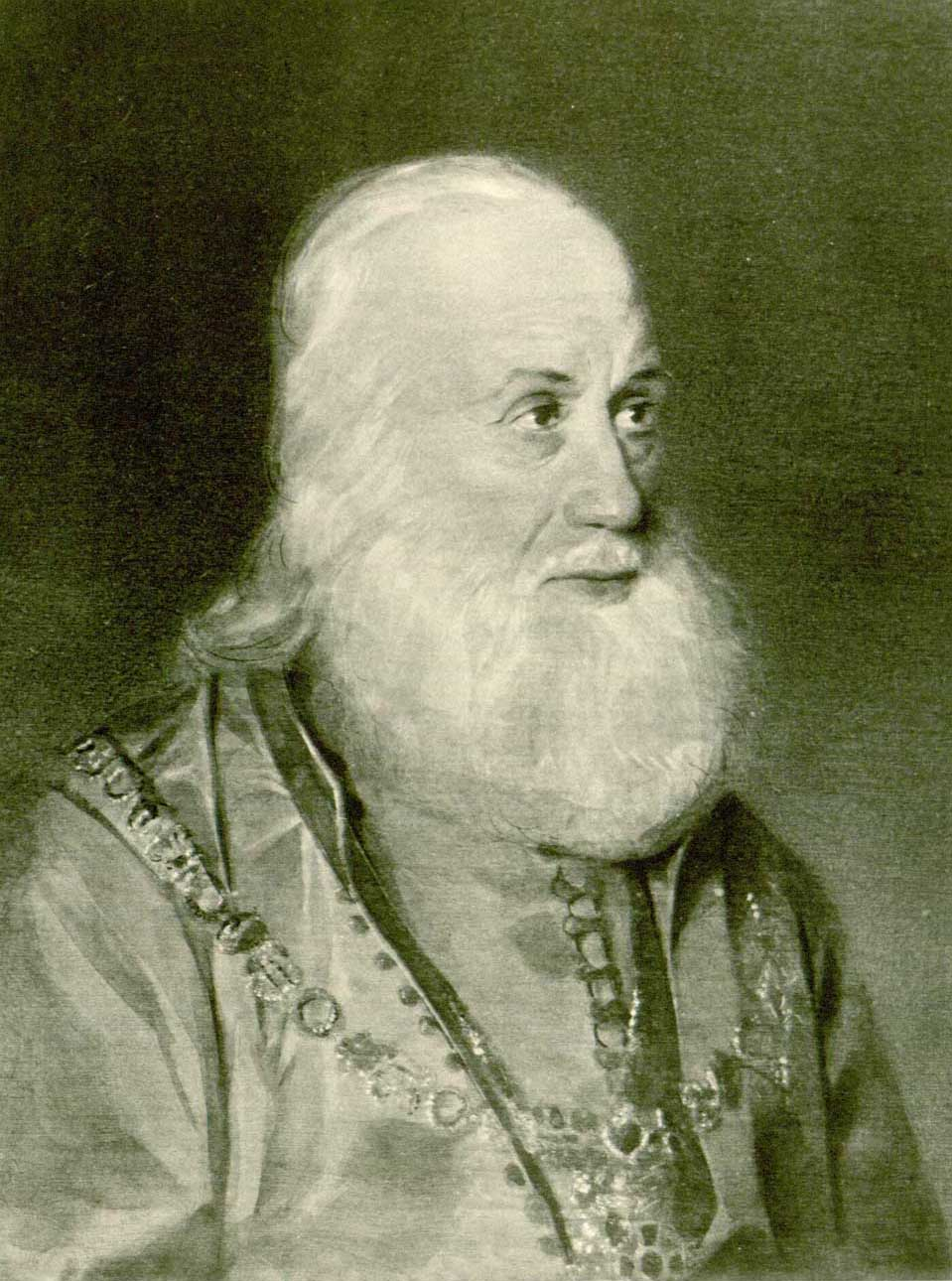
- Church: Serbian Orthodox Church
- Province: Military Frontier, Austrian Empire
- Metropolis: Metropolitanate of Karlovci
- Installed: 1790
- Term ended: 1836
- Predecessor: Mojisije Putnik
- Successor: Stefan Stanković

Personal details
- Born: 27 December 1757 Kulpin, Kingdom of Hungary (now Serbia)
- Died: 22 September 1836 (aged 78) Sremski Karlovci, Slavonia, Austrian Empire (now Serbia)
- Denomination: Eastern Orthodox
- Residence: Sremski Karlovci

Stefan Stratimirović (Serbian: Стефан Стратимировић; 27 December 1757 – 22 September 1836) was a Serbian bishop who served as the Metropolitan of Karlovci, head of the Serbian Orthodox Church in the Austrian Empire, between 1790 and 1836. Having been appointed metropolitan at the age of 33, Stratimirović maintained control over church life decisively and autonomously. He was an aid to Serbian rebel leader Karađorđe during the First Serbian Uprising and actively participated in the suppression of Tican's Rebellion in 1807. Furthermore, he published Jovan Rajić's seminal work at a most propitious occasion.

== Early life and appointment ==
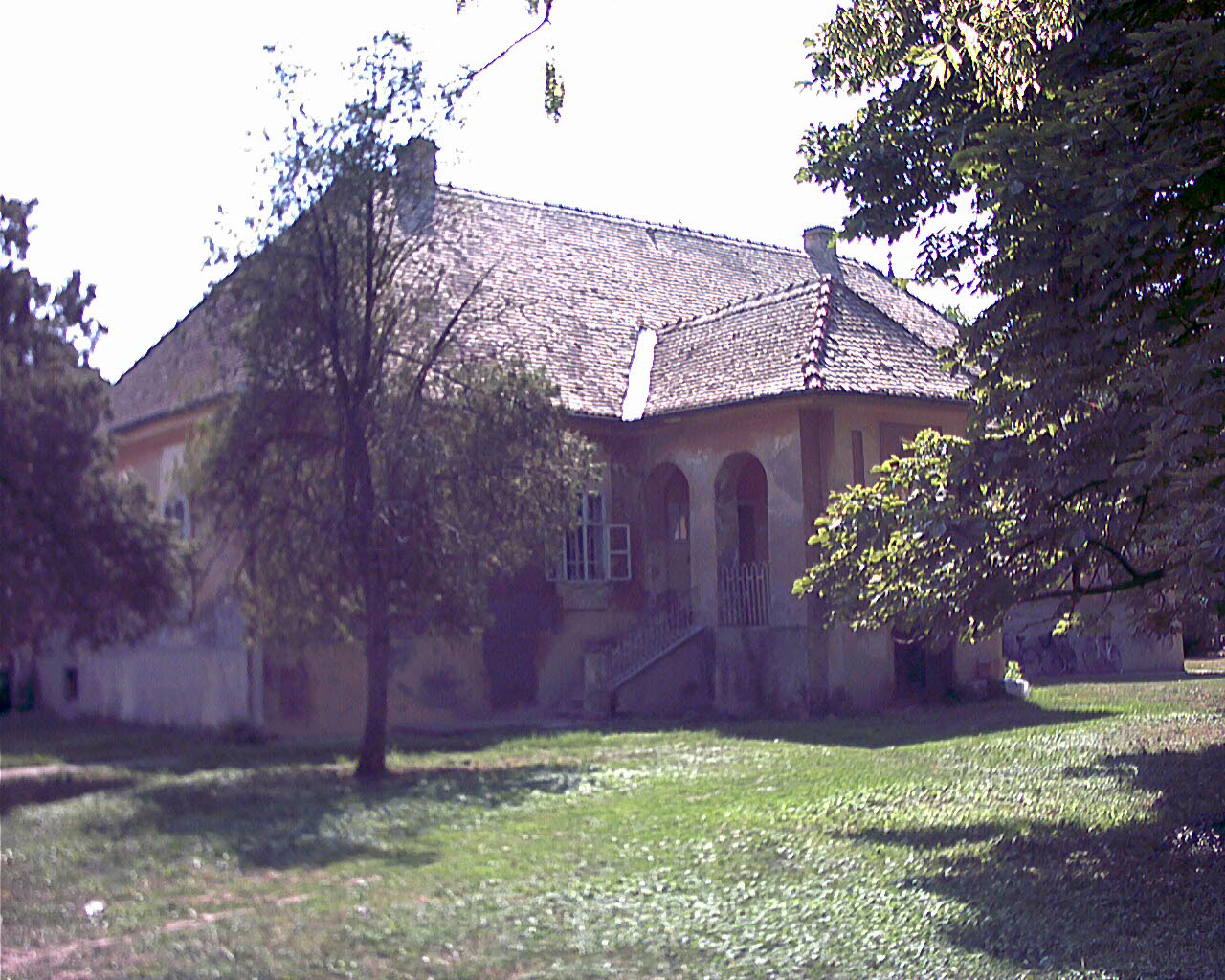
Stratimirović family house in Kulpin, Serbia.

Born in Kulpin, a town in the Military Frontier, Stratimirović's family hailed from Herzegovina. Stratimirović lived in a private estate awarded to his family by Marie Therese in 1745. He graduated from grade schools in Kulpin and Begeč and later attained the Gymnasium in Novi Sad, from which he also graduated. Stratimirović subsequently studied philosophy and law in Vienna and Buda, later moving on to theology which he studied privately in Sremski Karlovci under Serbian archimandrite Jovan Rajić, because there were not yet any Serbian theology schools at the time. In 1784 he joined the Serbian Orthodox Church as a monk, and in 1786 he was appointed Bishop of Vršac. Sometime later, he was appointed in the Eparchy of Buda, where he served for four years, from 1786 to 1790. On October 29, 1790, Stratimirović was made Metropolitan of Karlovci at the Assembly of Timișoara, at the age of 33.

== Metropolitan of Karlovci ==
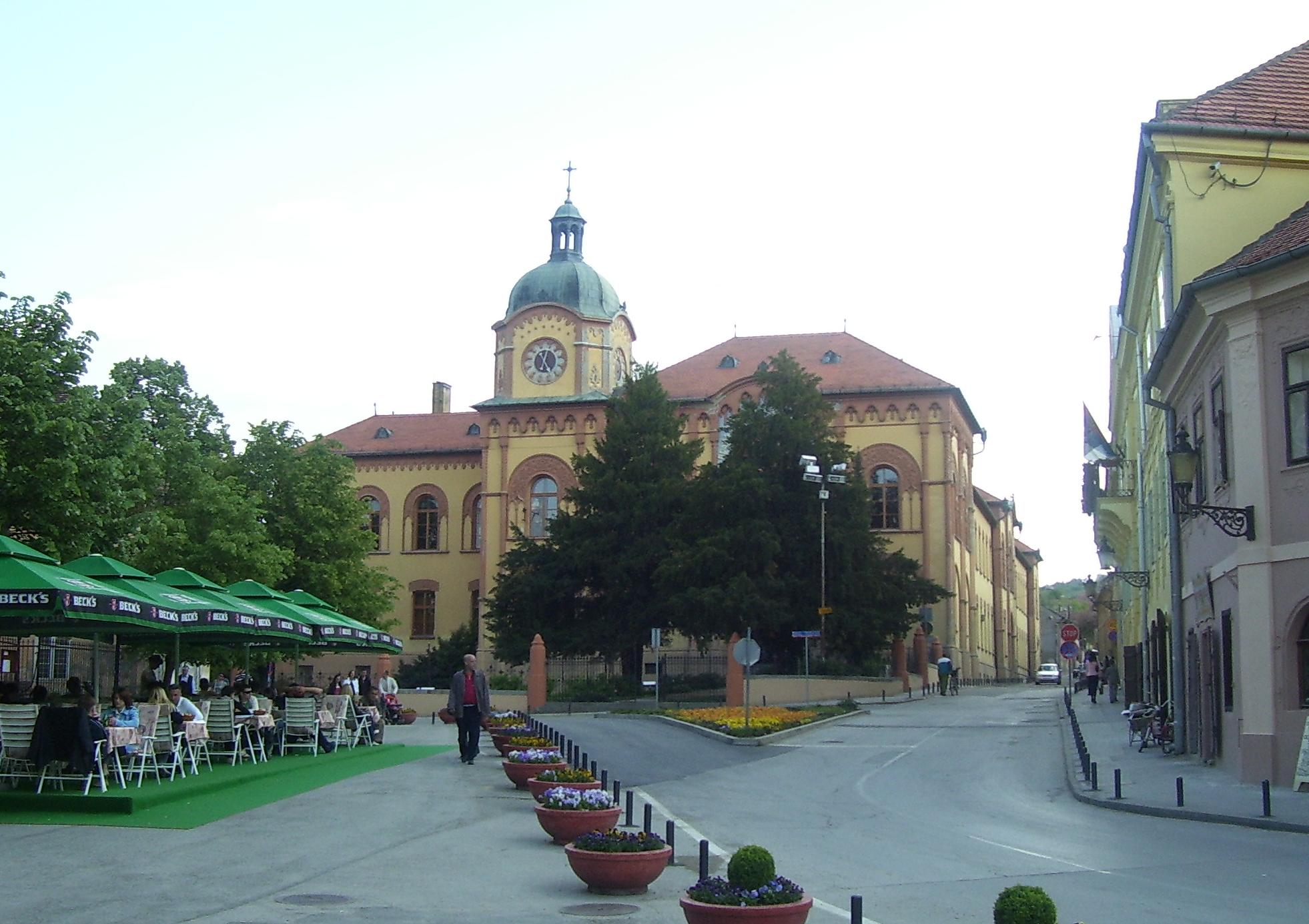
The Gymnasium of Karlovci, established by Stratimirović in 1792.

As metropolitan, Stratimirović paid special attention to the building of educational institutions. With the help of merchant Dimitrije Sabov he founded the Gymnasium of Karlovci in 1792, in 1794 the Karlovci Theology School, and in 1795 the Blagodejanije fund (later called "Stefaneum"). He edited and expanded the Metropolitanate library and established higher discipline within the clergy. As a religious leader, he inspired independence and supported the First Serbian Uprising (1804–13), despite leading the clergy remotely from within the Austrian Empire. He led a struggle against Viennese attempts of unifying Serbs with the Austrian Empire. He was a devoted enthusiast of both science and literature.

Under the strong influence of the conflict for preserving orthodoxy, Stratimirović gradually became more and more conservative and in so doing was opposed to the language reformations of Dositej Obradović, Sava Mrkalj, and Vuk Stefanović Karadžić. During the Serbian uprising he helped the rebels in secret by assisting in the supply of munitions and gunpowder from Prussia. In June 1804, he informed the Russian court of the plan of reviving the Serbian Empire as a protectorate of Russia, known as the Memorandum. In 1807 he played an active role in silencing Tican's Rebellion in Srem.

His legacy includes many works in a variety of languages and subjects. Although only two of his major works were ever printed during his lifetime, he wrote many other works in Latin, German and Serbian, among which there are historical, clerical, literary and other texts. After his death in 1836, more of his works were printed in published. Although requested, a biography was never written on his behalf, and only a list of his works and an outline on his life were ever written and published for the general public.

Stratimirović was decorated Order of Leopold of the first class.

== Serbian Revolution ==
There were various plans of restoring a Serbian state in the 18th century, with either Habsburg or Russian support, but these had ultimately failed. In 1736–37 Serbian Patriarch Arsenije IV envisioned an autonomous South Slavic state led by the Serbs under the Habsburg Monarchy with a similar status to Hungary, under the governance of the Serbian Patriarch. In 1782 the former Metropolitan Vasilije Petrović in Montenegro (s. 1744–1766) envisioned the restoration of the medieval Serbian state including territories in the Balkans and southern Habsburg Monarchy, while his successor Petar I Petrović's envoy to Russia presented the project of "kingdom of Old Rascia" in 1798. The archimandrite of Morača Arsenije Gagović submitted a proposal in 1803 to the Russian court regarding a "Slavic-Serb empire" ruled by a Russian prince, likely with consultation of Metropolitan Stefan Stratimirović. Stratimirović sent a confidential memorandum to Russian emperor Alexander I in June 1804 (during the uprising) regarding the establishment of an independent Serbian monarchy under the House of Romanov encompassing Serbia, Bosnia, Montenegro, Herzegovina, Syrmia, the Bay of Kotor and much of Dalmatia. At the end of 1804 he sent another draft regarding a new Slavic-Serb state under Russian protection that included Serb-inhabited territory, put under the sovereignty of the Ottoman Empire but governed by a Russian or Lutheran prince as a guarantee of autonomy, modeling the relations to the Porte after the Republic of Ragusa and the Septinsular Republic.

During the uprising against the Dahije, archpriest of Zemun Mihailo Pejić informed Stratimirović on the early events, including the Slaughter of the Knezes, which included the murder of archimandrite Hadži-Ruvim, the establishment of Serb rebel detachments and the clash at Drlupa and failure of negotiations. He informed Stratimirović on 6 June 1804 that Leontius and Antim Zepos were safe in Semlin, waiting to cross back into Serbia. Pejić brought the news of the conquest of Belgrade by the Serbian rebels.

In November 1809, archimandrite Melentije Stevanović was sent with a group to Russia to ask for the appointment of Melentije as a bishop of Serbia, which was denied. Leontius, who was in conflict with Karađorđe and had earlier left Serbia, was allowed to return but sickness made him put Melentije as his representative (as "administrator of all Serbia") in 1810. In 1811, the Serbian leadership sent Melentije to Wallachia to ask to be ordained as bishop of the two eparchies in Serbian territory, but this was denied again, as against Ottoman interest, against the Ecumenical Patriarchate, and uncanonical. Melentije continued to serve as the de facto metropolitan, at the same time being a military commander. It is believed that the Serbian leadership sought help from Stratimirović to appoint Antim Zepos as Metropolitan of Belgrade, and Melentije as Metropolitan of Užice-Valjevo.

== Legacy ==
He is included in The 100 most prominent Serbs.

== Annotations ==
1. His name is spelled Stefan Stratimirović (Стефан Стратимировић). and Stevan Stratimirović (Стеван Стратимировић).

== See also ==
- Metropolitanate of Karlovci
- List of heads of the Serbian Orthodox Church

== Sources ==
- Bataković, Dušan T. (2006). "A Balkan-Style French Revolution? The 1804 Serbian Uprising in European Perspective". Balcanica (36): 113–128. doi:10.2298/BALC0536113B.
- Eraković, Radoslav Lj. (2012). "ПОРТРЕТИ КАРЛОВАЧКИХ МИТРОПОЛИТА У ДЕЛИМА СРПСКИХ ПИСАЦА". Godišnjak Filozofskog fakulteta. 37 (2).
- Jerotijević, Dušan (2020). "Српска православна црква у међународним односима са посебним освртом на односе са Руском православном црквом". Church Studies. 17: 221–240.
- Ninković, Nenad (2016). "Стефан Стратимировић као будимски епископ (1786–1790)". Српске студије. 7: 154–155.
- Ninković, Nenad; Vasin, Goran (2017). "The role of metropolitan Stefan Stratimirović in health care education of Serbs in the Habsburg Monarchy". Acta Historiae Medicinae, Stomatologiae, Pharmaciae, Medicinae Veterinariae. 36 (1–2): 35–45. doi:10.25106/ahm.2017.2912.
- Perović, Radoslav (1978), "Први српски устанак (акти и писма)", Акти и писма бр. 451, 1, Belgrade: Narodna knjiga
- Popović, Radomir J. (2013). Идеал независности и нужност аутономије: настанак српске нововековне државе државе 1788/1804-1833. године (PDF). Два века модерне српске дипломатије. Балканолошки институт САНУ. pp. 69–88. ISBN 978-86-7179-079-6.
- Radojčić, Nikola (1936). "Митрополит Стефан Стратимировић". Летопис Матице српске. 345 (1): 40–60.
- Radosavljević, Nedeljko V. (2007). Православна црква у Београдском пашалуку 1766-1831 [Orthodox Church in the Belgrade Pashalik 1766-1831]. Istorijski institut. ISBN 978-86-7743-065-8.
- Radosavljević, Nedeljko V. (2009). Шест портрета православних митрополита 1766–1891 [Six Portraits of Orthodox Metropolitans 1766–1891]. Istorijski institut. ISBN 978-86-7743-078-8.
- Ranković, Zoran (2015). "Библиотека Српске Патријаршије и њен значај за очување и прикупљање српског рукописног наслеђа". Српска теологија у двадесетом веку: истраживачки проблеми и резултати. 19: 89–101.
- Sotirović, Vladislav B. (2001). "Serbia Rediviva: меморандум митрополита Стратимировиhа из 1804 г. ствараньу словенскосрпске великие кнежевине". Kalbotyra. 50: 9–30.
- Sotirović, Vladislav B. (2012). "The Memorandum (1804) by the Karlovci Metropolitan Stevan Stratimirović". Serbian Studies: Journal of the North American Society for Serbian Studies. 24 (1–2). Slavica Publishers: 27−48. doi:10.1353/ser.2012.0012.
- Todić, B. "Први покушаји штампања Даниловог зборника" [The first attempt to print Danilo's Collection] (PDF). Прилози за књижевност, језик, историју и фолклор. 86: 33–49.

Vacant Title last held by Sofronije Kirilović	Bishop of Buda; 1786–1790	Succeeded by Dionisije Popović
Preceded by Mojisije Putnik	Metropolitan of Karlovci; 1790–1836	Succeeded by Stefan Stanković
