= Commandant =

Title given to the officer in charge of a military unit

Commandant (/ˌkɒmənˈdɑːnt/ or /ˌkɒmənˈdænt/; French: [kɔmɑ̃dɑ̃]) is a title often given to the officer in charge of a military (or other uniformed service) training establishment or academy. This usage is common in English-speaking nations. In some countries it may be a military or police rank. It is also often used to refer to the commander of a military prison or prison camp (including concentration camps and prisoner of war camps).

== Bangladesh ==
In Bangladesh Armed Forces and Bangladesh Marine Academy commandant is not any rank. It is an appointment. The commandant serves as the head of any military or merchant navy training institutes or unit.

== Canada ==
Commandant is the normal Canadian French-language term for the commanding officer of a mid-sized unit, such as a regiment or battalion, within the Canadian Forces. In smaller units, the commander is usually known in French as the officier commandant.

Conversely, in Canadian English, the word commandant is used exclusively for the commanding officers of military units that provide oversight and/or services to a resident population (such as a military school or college, a long-term health care facility or a detention facility.

== France ==
In the French Army and French Air Force, the term commandant is used as a rank equivalent to major (NATO rank code OF-3). However, in the French Navy commandant is the style, but not the rank, of the senior officers, specifically capitaine de corvette, capitaine de frégate and capitaine de vaisseau.

== Germany ==
In the German language, a military Kommandant is the commanding officer of a military installation (e.g. a fortress), vehicle, aircraft (the pilot is not always Kommandant, if another crew member has a higher rank) or vessel (e.g. U-Boot-Kommandant). In contrast to the governor, the fortress commandant of the Imperial German Army or the Wehrmacht never had higher but only lower jurisdiction. When subordinate to a governor, his duties were limited to garrison duty. Subordinate to him was the Platzmajor.

In the navy of the Bundeswehr, commandants, including former commandants, wear the special commandant badge. When the commandant is active, it is worn on the right side of the chest above the breast pocket. Former commandants wear it on the left breast under the name tag.

In Baden-Württemberg, Bavaria, Austria, Switzerland and South Tyrol, the head of the volunteer fire brigade is called the Kommandant. As such, he leads the fire brigade and is responsible for the training and deployment of his local fire brigade. In his own local area, he leads the operations management of all fire brigades as long as this is not taken over by the higher-level operations management.

== India ==
In the Indian Armed Forces, 'Commandant' is not a rank but an appointment. Commandant is the title of the heads of the Training establishments. Examples include:

- Commandant of the National Defence Academy
- Commandant of the Indian Military Academy
- Commandant of the National Defence College
- Commandant of Indian Naval Academy

In the Indian Army, the commanding officer of an armoured regiment or a Mechanized infantry regiment (Mechanised Infantry Regiment, Brigade of The Guards) is known as the commandant.

Commandant is a rank in the Central Armed Police Forces of India. It is equivalent to the rank of colonel/captain/group captain. In the Indian Coast Guard, ranks of commandant and commandant (junior grade) exist. While commandant is equivalent to colonel/captain/group captain, commandant (junior grade) is equivalent to lieutenant colonel/commander/wing commander.

In the State Armed Police Forces, a commandant serves as the head of an armed police battalion. The rank of commandant is equivalent to that of a superintendent of police (SP).

== Ireland ==
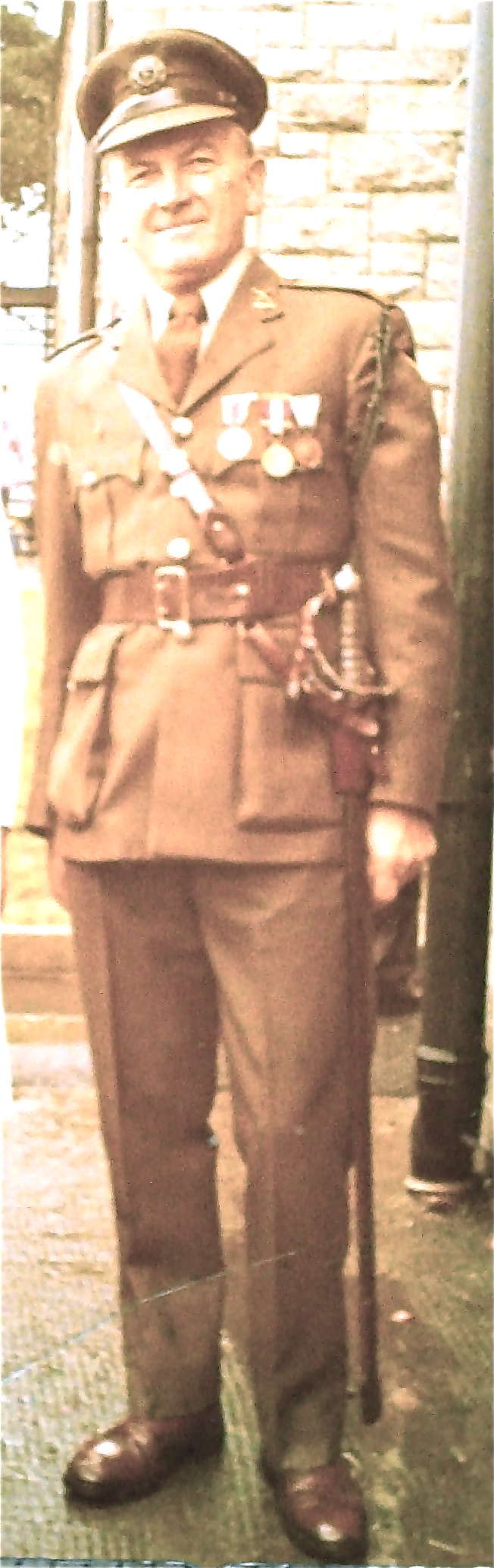
Commandant Patrick Denis O'Donnell, Irish Army, 1979.

In the Irish Army, commandant (Comdt; Irish: ceannfort) is the equivalent of major in other armies. Irish Army commandants can sometimes be referred to as major if serving overseas under the umbrella of the United Nations or the European Union to alleviate misunderstanding.

== Kenya ==
=== Kenya Defence Forces ===
In the Kenya Defence Forces, Commandant is an appointment. Commandant is the title of the head of the training institutions. Examples include:

- Commandant of the Recruits Training School
- Commandant of the Kenya Military Academy
- Commandant of the National Defence College
- Commandant of the Defence Staff College
- Commandant of School of Infantry

=== National Police Service ===
In the National Police Service, the title of Commandant is reserved for commanders of large training institutions or commanders of large independent units. As with the Army, the post of a commander of a medium size unit is referred to as the Commanding Officer (CO) while the smallest is Officer Commanding (OC).

Example:

- Commandant of the General Service Unit (GSU)
- Commandant National Police College Embakasi A Campus
- Commandant Rapid Deployment
- Commandant Kenya Airports Police Unit

== Lithuania ==
In the Lithuanian Armed Forces the Military Commandant's Offices Command is a territorial security-oriented formation, responsible for ensuring military order, security, and defense of critical infrastructure in the rear. It oversees the Military Commandant's Offices, which perform tasks such as facility protection, communication security, counter-sabotage operations, and maintaining order in designated areas.

The command also manages the mobilization process and supports national defense efforts through its structured territorial presence.

== Philippines ==
In the Philippines, a Commandant is an appointment and not a rank but once selected, the appointee is promoted to the highest rank on the service. Commandants are appointed by the President of the Philippines either after the incumbent retires or as a replacement after dismissal.

There are currently two Commandant appointments that exist in the Philippines namely:

- Commandant of the Philippine Marine Corps; and
- Commandant of the Philippine Coast Guard

The Commandant of the Philippine Marine Corps will be promoted to the rank of Major General (Two-star Rank) once appointed while the Commandant of the Philippine Coast Guard will be promoted to the rank of an Admiral (Four-star Rank).

== South Africa ==
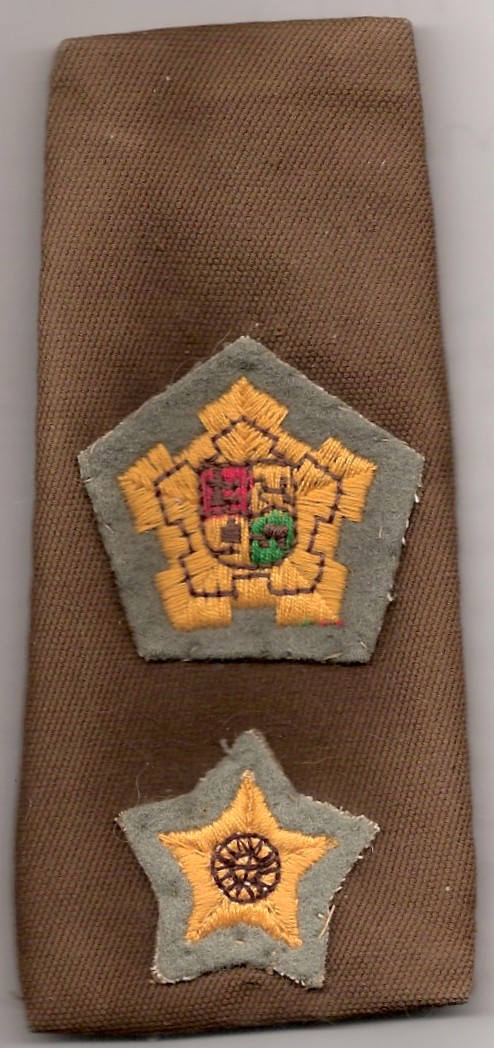
South African army commandant insignia 1950-1994

In South Africa, Commandant was the title of the commanding officer of a commando (militia) unit in the 19th and early 20th centuries.

During the First World War, Commandant was used as a title by officers commanding Defence Rifle Association units, also known as Burgher commandos. The commandos were militia units raised in emergencies and constituted the third line of defence after the Permanent Force and the part-time Active Citizen Force regiments. The commandant rank was equivalent to major or lieutenant-colonel, depending on the size of the commando.

From 1950 to 1994, commandant was the rank equivalent to lieutenant colonel and commander of a battalion. The rank was used by both the Army and the Air Force. The naval equivalent was commander (Afrikaans: kommandeur). The rank was not used by the South African Police, who continued with lieutenant colonel [luitenant-kolonel].

The rank insignia for a Commandant (Afrikaans: Kommandant) was initially a crown over a five-pointed star. In 1957 the crown was replaced by a pentagonal castle device based on the floor plan of the Castle of Good Hope in Cape Town, South Africa's oldest military building. In 1994, the rank of Commandant / Kommandant reverted to lieutenant colonel.

From 1968 to 1970, a related rank, Chief Commandant, existed in the commando forces. (Note: the part-time, territorial reserve, roughly equivalent to a National Guard or Home Guard)

Recently, use of the term has followed the standard practice, i.e. the commanding officer of a training institute.

== New Zealand ==
In the New Zealand Defence Force, the term commandant is used for the senior officer (or commander) of garrisoned units that do not deploy and are not operational. This typically includes learning institutes such as the New Zealand Defence College, the New Zealand Cadet Force, and (formerly) the Command and Staff College. The title could also be used for other non-deploying units such as the Services Corrective Establishment in Burnham, or depot-level engineering units.

The equivalent term for operational units is 'commander', such as commander of the Joint Force Headquarters New Zealand.

Under the 2010 creation of the Training and Education Directorate, an additional position of commandant was established for the Training Institute to complement the commandant of the Defence College.

== Russia ==
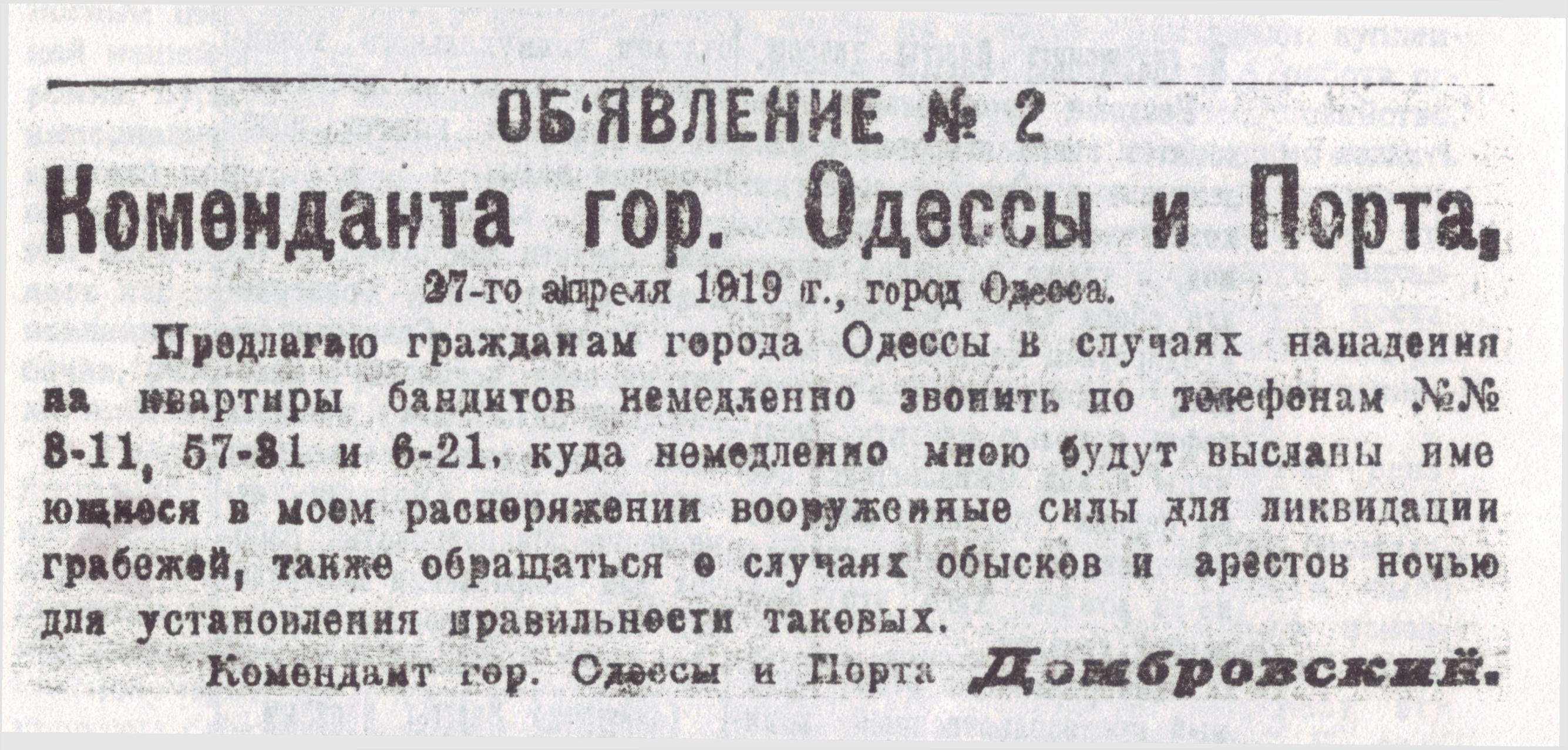
Announcement from the commandant of Odessa: call about bandit raids, 1919

In Russia and prior to that in the Soviet Union and Imperial Russia the position of commandant was widely used and may have various meanings:

- Palace commandant — a position in the Ministry of the Imperial Court, from March 14, 1896, the head of the governing body for the defense and protection of the imperial family.
- Fortress commandant — the commander of the fortress, and where there is none, the head of the city garrison, that is, the city commandant.
- City commandant— in Russia was in every city and in those villages where two or more separate military units or teams were located. To fill the commandant positions in St. Petersburg, Moscow, Tsarskoye Selo, Gatchina, Petergof, Warsaw, Tiflis, Nikolaev and some other cities, special persons were appointed. In other cities, the duties of the commandant were assigned to district military commanders, and where there were none, to one of the officers of the local garrison. City commandants were subordinate to the chief commander of the military district and the head of the garrison.

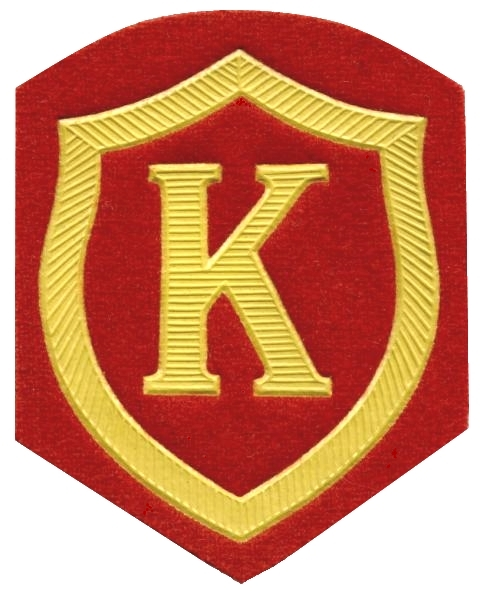
Emblem of the units of the commandant's office of the Soviet Armed Forces

- City garrison commandant — supervises the observance of discipline and order in the troops stationed in the city, guard duty and the detention of military personnel arrested for disciplinary offenses. In the Soviet Armed Forces and in the contemporary Russian Armed Forces, the commandant is the head of the military commandant's office of the garrison — the main body for managing the garrison service. In small garrisons that do not have a regular military commandant's office, a non-staff commandant is appointed by order of the garrison chief, usually the senior in position among the commanders of the commandant's units of the military units stationed in the garrison.
- Military commandant of a railway station — an officer appointed to supervise the correctness and timeliness of the movement of military units (military echelons) and cargo, as well as the loading and unloading of military trains.
- Commandant of a border section — the head of a border commandant's office — the head of a unit of a border detachment intended to protect a specific section of the state border. Responsible for:
  - Protection of the designated section and operational work;
  - Combat readiness, combat training, morale and psychological state and military discipline of the personnel of border outposts and other units of the commandant's office;
  - Condition and effective use of weapons and equipment, engineering structures and barriers in border protection;
  - Implementation of activities for types of service and combat actions. When organizing the protection of the state border, ensures the implementation of the decision of the head of the border detachment and makes decisions in the event of a sharp change in the situation, and supervises subordinate border units.

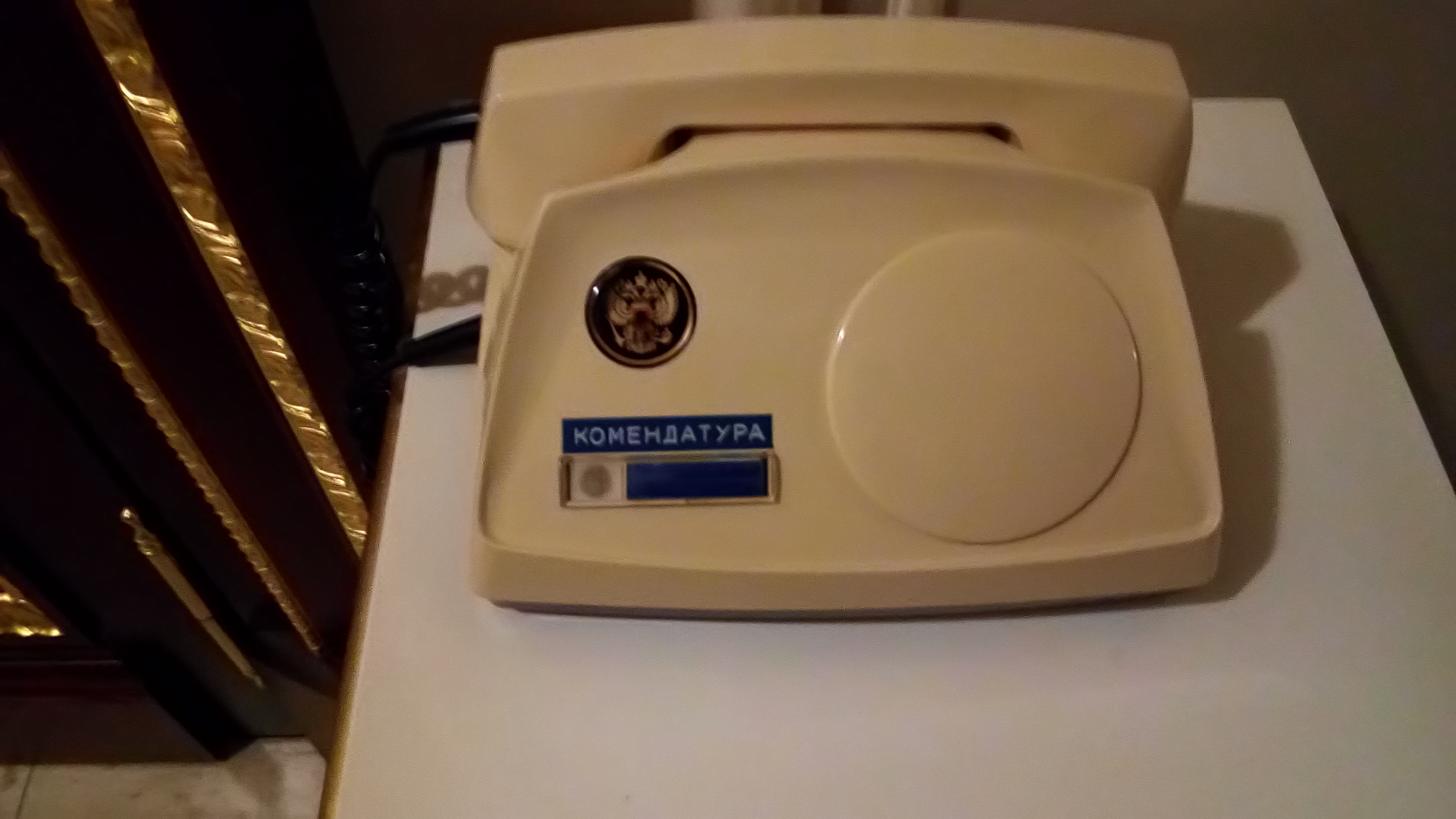
Commandant's landline telephone at the Constantine Palace, one of the residences of the President of Russia

- Commandant of headquarters — a position established in wartime as part of the field headquarters of the Russian Imperial Army. Under his immediate control were the convoy with the gendarme unit or team and the wagon train of headquarters. Subordinate to him were sutlers, artisans, traders, industrialists, servants and all private individuals in general located in the area of the headquarters. He had the right to subject them to arrest for up to 1 month and a fine of up to 100 rubles.
- Corps commandant — was part of the corps administration according to the wartime staffing of the armed forces of the Russian Empire. His range of activities in the area of the corps headquarters generally coincided with the range of activities of the commandant of the headquarters.
- Stage commandant — was appointed in the army of the Russian Empire to manage each stage in wartime. In the area under his jurisdiction, the stage commandant was a representative of military authority and the immediate superior of all military teams and ranks located on stage for local guard, convoy and military police service. In areas occupied by right of war, until the establishment of special civil administration, all local administrative and police bodies were subordinate to him. He ordered the allocation of premises for passing units and commands, for hospitals, infirmaries and for all directorates and headquarters. The stage commandants had: an office, assistants and officers to perform the duties of commandant adjutants.
- Commandant of a city or locality in an occupied territory — a representative of the occupying military authorities.
- Commandant of a locality in which a state of emergency has been declared — responsible for ensuring the state of emergency, may impose a curfew.
- Commandants — district governors and commanders of local garrisons in the Russian Empire of the 18th century. Sometimes commandants were only district governors, especially before 1715; after that year, command of the garrison became the main and even exclusive responsibility of commandants: where there are no garrisons, there are no commandants, says the decree of 1715. The only exceptions were Ukrainian cities, for fear of enemy raids. As heads of garrisons, commandants were under the authority of the field marshal or governor. As district governors, commandants were completely dependent on governors, especially since 1712, when governors were given the right to choose commandants "from among capable people" and sometimes to chair the court over commandants. Chief commandants were appointed only in provinces, but not everywhere. Sometimes they replaced vice-governors and even governors in their absence. They were assisted by landrats, from 6 to 4, depending on the size of the province. Paul I, by a number of decrees dating back to 1797, increased the power and importance of commandants, giving them the right to address reports to him personally, and abolished the positions of chief commandants, as well as commandants in cities without garrison. In 1808, commandants were removed from the jurisdiction of governors and their duties were limited to garrison service.
- Commandant — the head of the economic department and technical staff in some government and public institutions (hostels, theater buildings, etc.).

== Singapore ==
In the National Police Cadet Corps (NPCC), the position of Commandant is given to a Singapore Police Force officer who heads NPCC. The Commandant is aided by his Assistant Commandants, who are NPCC officers. As NPCC units around Singapore are divided into 20 "areas", each area is headed by an Area Commandant who is an NPCC officer. This Area Commandant is also usually an Officer from one of the units in the area that he/she is taking charge of.

== Sri Lanka ==
In Sri Lanka, the Commandant of the Volunteer Force is the head of the Sri Lanka Army Volunteer Force. Commandant is also the title used for the commanding officer (one-star rank) of military academies - Sri Lanka Military Academy, Naval and Maritime Academy and Air Force Academy - and the commanding officer (two-star rank) of the Defence Services Command and Staff College. It is also the title of the de facto vice-chancellor of the General Sir John Kotelawala Defence University, usually an officer of two-star rank.

Colonel-commandant is an honorary post in corps of the army and the Sri Lanka National Guard, similar to that of Colonel of the Regiment found in infantry regiments. The post of centre commandant is the commanding officer of a corps or regiment. Commandant is the head of the Special Task Force of the Sri Lanka Police.

== United Kingdom ==
In the British Armed Forces, a commandant is usually the commanding officer of a training establishment, such as the Royal Military Academy Sandhurst or the Royal Air Force College Cranwell. In early 19th century England, the term commandant was used interchangeably with commandment - i.e., a person could act as a Commandment of the Justices - an officer-in-charge.

Colonel-commandant was an appointment which existed in the British Army between 1922 and 1928, and in the Royal Marines from 1755 to some time after World War II. It replaced brigadier-general in the army, and was itself replaced by brigadier in both the army and the Marines. The colonel-commandant is also the ceremonial head of some Army corps and this position is usually held by a senior general.

Commandant was also the appointment, equivalent to commodore, held by the director of the Women's Royal Naval Service between 1951 and 1993.

In the Army Cadet Force, a colonel is customarily the most senior commissioned officer in charge of an ACF county. This rank is thus known as the commandant and their second-in-command (2IC) is the deputy commandant, who has the rank of lieutenant colonel.

In the Royal Air Force Air Cadets, the officer in charge of the organisation is given the title Commandant Air Cadets and holds the position for two years.

Formerly, commandant was the usual title for the head of the Special Constabulary within a police force. In some forces, the title was chief commandant, with subordinate divisional or sub-divisional commandants. The standard title for this position is now chief officer.

In the Voluntary Aid Organisation in World War I, the chief officer of a military hospital or voluntary aid detachment (VAD), whether male or female, held the title of commandant.

== United States ==
In the United States, "commandant" is an appointment, not a rank, and the following three appointments currently exist:

- Commandant of the Marine Corps
- Commandant of the Coast Guard
- Commandant of the Operations (Ships)

Formerly, admirals were appointed as commandants of naval districts.

The commandant is the second most senior officer (after the superintendent) of United States Service academies, such as United States Military Academy, United States Naval Academy, and the United States Air Force Academy, equivalent to the dean of students at a civilian college. Commandant is also the title of the commanding officer of many units of the United States Army Training and Doctrine Command, including the non-commissioned officer academies, whose commandants are typically command sergeants major.

Commandant is also the title of the ranking officer in charge of each War college of the United States military, and is responsible for the administration, academic progress and success of the civilians and military officers assigned to the college. The commandant is a model for all personnel, a military academy graduate of impeccable character and bearing who has demonstrated accomplishment in both academic excellence and active military service in the field. They include the Naval War College, the USAF Air War College, the Army War College, the Marine Corps War College and the National War College.

Commandant is the duty title for the commanding officer of the US Air Force Test Pilot School.

Commandant is also the duty title of the senior enlisted leader of a Professional Military Education (PME) academy, such as the Airman Leadership School, Non-Commissioned Officer Academy, and Senior Non-Commissioned Officer Academy.

The title may also be used for the commander of a unit headquarters, who is usually responsible for administrative matters such as billeting and is called the headquarters commandant; this may also be a duty assigned to a staff officer in large headquarters.

Historically, master commandant was a rank of the United States Navy established in 1806 for commanders of smaller warships. It was renamed in 1837 to "commander", which is a rank still used today.

== See also ==
- Commandant general, in Fascist Italy, was the head of the Milizia Volontaria per la Sicurezza Nazionale (National Security Volunteer Militia or "Blackshirts"), a position held by Benito Mussolini.
- Commandant's Service, a military police type force in some militaries.
