= Paul von Mitesser =

- Born: Paul Joseph von Mitesser; 1757; Semlin (Zemun)
- Died: 10 April 1833 (aged 75–76); Vienna, Austrian Empire
- Other name: Mitezer
- Military career
- Allegiance: Habsburg Monarchy
- Branch: Hofkriegsrat
- Rank: platzmajor, oberst-lieutenant
- Commands: Semlin (Zemun)
- Conflicts: Austro-Turkish War (1788–1791)

Paul von Mitesser (1757–1833) was an Austrian platzmajor (fortress officer) based in Semlin (Zemun) at the Habsburg-Ottoman border and spy active in the European part of the Ottoman Empire. He was an intermediate between the Austrian military command and the Serbs in the Pashalik of Belgrade. Following the outbreak of the First Serbian Uprising (1804–13) he became an Austrian contact of Revolutionary Serbia. He served as an Austrian consul in Travnik, Sanjak of Bosnia, tasked with upholding Austro-Ottoman relations and counter French and Russian influence.

== Career ==
Paul Joseph von Mitesser was an Austrian officer ranked captain on 20 August 1791, major on 5 September 1799, serving as platzmajor (fortress officer) at Semlin, then oberst-lieutenant on 4 June 1807.

He served as an Austrian consul in Travnik, Sanjak of Bosnia, from 1807 to 1810. In 1813 he received a diploma with the nobiliary particle "von Dervent" while ranked Austrian k. k. oberstlieutenant.

Mitesser was active in a period of Austrian, French and Russian struggle for the Balkans.

=== Serbian contact ===
To the south of the Habsburg Monarchy lay the Ottoman province of Sanjak of Smederevo (known in historiography as "Pashalik of Belgrade", encompassing central Serbia). This province was inhabited by the Orthodox Serbs, who had joined the Austrians in their wars against the Ottomans and suffered consequences due to their failure.

Austria sent officers into Serbia for reconnaissance in 1783–84. These officers had trusted Serb associates, among whom were clergymen such as Isaija Stevanović of Gornjak, Vićentije Jovanović of Ravanica and monks of Ljubostinja, Voljavča, Vraćevšnica, Drača, etc. In 1784 three officers began their work in Serbia, fähnrich Pokorny disguised as "Pavle Gregorić", sub-lieutenant Mitesser as "Mihailo Kovačević" and Peretić as "Maksim Krstonošić". The trio were taken care of by monks Đorđe Dedejić of Nikolje and Vićentije Jovanović of Ravanica, who both were awarded a state pension by the Austrian emperor due to their good work.

The Serbs, oppressed by the Ottoman authorities and Janissaries, supported Austria in the Austro-Turkish War (1788–1791). They formed the Serbian Free Corps and managed to liberate an area in central Serbia known in historiography as Koča's Frontier. During the war Mitesser befriended Free Corps member Aleksa Nenadović from Valjevo. The war ended with a return under Ottoman rule, with the Porte giving amnesty to participants on the Austrian side and banning the problematic janissaries from the Belgrade Pashalik. The Janissary Dahije wrested the Pashalik of Belgrade from the Sultan in 1801, renewed terror, and abolished the Serbs' self-governing rights. The banished sipahi and loyal Muslims organized a rebellion against the Janissaries with the support of the Serbs in mid-1802, but it failed, resulting in further oppression.

In 1803 leading Serbs of the Pashalik planned a rebellion against the oppressive Dahije, with two central figures, Aleksa Nenadović in Valjevo and Karađorđe in Šumadija, both Free Corps veterans. The Dahije learnt of a conspiracy between the Serbs and Mustafa Pasha's associates (who wanted revenge) to rise against the Dahije, as well as intercepted a letter to the Austrian military in Zemun. This letter had been sent by Aleksa Nenadović and fellow leaders to major Mitesser at Semlin. Mitesser obtained gunpowder and lead for his friend Aleksa Nenadović. The Dahije decided to kill Serb leaders to thwart a rebellion against them. The "Slaughter of the Knezes" stretching from Late December 1803–4 February 1804 included the execution of Aleksa Nenadović, who had the conspiratory letter read to him and the crowd out loud before decapitation.

The economic hardships, evil administration, violence, and "Slaughter of the Knezes" led to the uprising against the Dahije in the beginning of 1804. Mitesser continued to supply Aleksa's brother Jakov Nenadović, the leading commander in Valjevo, with gunpowder and lead. Jakov sent his nephew, archpriest Matija Nenadović, the son of Aleksa, to Mitesser at Semlin to obtain equipment. Matija assembled rebels in Zabrežje and informed them that he would go to Semlin and buy gunpowder. Upon arriving at Semlin, Mitesser told Matija that the Austrian military was unable to sell gunpowder and weapons to the Serbs; however, he introduced him to two refugee Serbs from whom Matija ordered and bought gunpowder and lead. Mitesser next introduced Matija to a Turk that stayed at Semlin, Deli-Amet, a man of Dervish Bey (Mustafa Pasha's son), and suggested that he take him with him to Serbia, as he would be useful. Matija and Deli-Amet agreed that Matija would trick Serb and Turk assemblies that Deli-Amet was sent with a firman (sultan's decree) to rise the Pashalik Turks against the Dahije, to fight alongside the Serbs, to rally greater support–this was successful and the rebel numbers quickly rose by late February 1804. Karađorđe informed Mitesser about the defeat of Turks at Batočina and Jagodina in a letter dated 16 April 1804. Karađorđe then defeated Kučuk-Alija at Paraćin, resulting in the expansion of the uprising in that area, under Ilija Barjaktarević.

Between 1807 and 1808 the Habsburg authorities noted a massive migration of Habsburg Serbs into Revolutionary Serbia.

=== Consulate at Travnik ===
Mitesser was the first Austrian consul in Travnik. He was appointed consul in November 1807. In 1807, he was tasked with ensuring the Bosnian Vizier that Austria did not plan a war against the Ottoman Empire. The consulate aimed to counter Russian and French influence in the province and to uphold good relations with the Ottoman Empire. Russian influence in southeastern Europe was seen in their alliance with Serbia (and Serbia's intensive contacts with Montenegro) which the consulate in Travnik under Mitesser aimed to tackle. Mitesser was able to win over the Bosnian Catholics from French influence with 800 forints yearly, and also sought to win over the Orthodox under archimandrite Gerasim Zelić who was in talks with French general Marmont. Weapons received by Mitesser in 1807 were used to bribe Ottoman Bosnian nobility, Catholic fratri and Orthodox priests to take a pro-Austrian stance. By the summer of 1808 Austria had most foreign influence in the Bosnia Eyalet. The Travnik consulate received rumours that Russia would soon conquer Vidin, Karađorđe would take Sarajevo, the Austrian would take first Bihać and then the rest of Bosnia. Austria managed to win over the Orthodox leadership in Bosnia, with Mitesser meeting with metropolitans Kalinik of Sarajevo and Joanikije of Zvornik at Travnik in October 1808. The metropolitans complained about bishop Venedikt Kraljević and expressed their support to Austria. Kraljević was instrumental in the failure of Jovan Jančić's rebellion.

Austria planned that an Ottoman defeat of the French would result in Dalmatia becoming united with Bosnia and Herzegovina and that the French blockade of Austria would be compensated with a stronger Austrian economic presence in Bosnia.

Mitesser was pensioned in April 1811. In March 1815 he was reactivated.

== See also ==
- Konstantin Rodofinikin (1760–1838), Russian agent in Serbia
- Ilija Novokršteni (d. 1813), Russian agent in Serbia

== Annotations ==
1. His full name was "Paul Joseph von Mitesser". In Serbian historiography, he is known simply as "Mitezer" (Митезер) and rarely by his whole name (Павле Митесер).

== Sources ==
- Andres, Dörte (2008). Dolmetscher als literarische Figuren: von Identitätsverlust, Dilettantismus und Verrat. Meidenbauer. ISBN 978-3-89975-117-8.
- Arsenijević-Batalaka, Lazar (1898). Историја српског устанка. Vol. 1. Изд. Баталакинога фонда.
- Gavrilović, Andra (1904). "Сеча кнезова". Црте из историје ослобођења Србије. Belgrade: Нздање дворске књижаре Мите Стајића у Београду. pp. 7–42. (Public Domain)
- Ivić, Aleksa (1935). "Spisi bečkih arhiva o Prvom srpskom ustanku: 1804". Zbornik. VIII. Belgrade.
- Jovanović, Dobrivoje (2014). "ПРВЕ БОРБЕ СА ТУРЦИМА И ОСЛОБОЂЕЊЕ ЈАГОДИНЕ" (PDF). Прошлост. 3. ISBN 978-86-914023-7-2.
- Kneschke, Ernst Heinrich (1865). Neues allgemeines Deutsches Adels-Lexicon im Vereine mit mehreren Historikern herausgegeben von E. H. Kneschke. p. 308.
- Krones, Franz Xaver (1890). Josef Freiherr von Simbschen und die Stellung Österreichs zur serbischen Frage (1807-1810). In Commission bei F. Tempsky. pp. 34, 38, 41.
- Müehlfeld, J. G. M. von (1822). Österreichisches Adels-Lexikon des achtzehnten u. neunzehnten Jahrhunderts enthaltend alle von 1701 bis 1820 von den Souveranen Österreichs ... in die verschiedenen Grade, des deutsch-erbländischen oder Reichs-Adels, erhobenen Personen. Morschner.
- Nedeljković, Slaviša D.; Đorđević, Miloš Z. (2015). "Политичке прилике у београдском пашалуку у предвечерје српске револуције (1787-1804)". Teme. XXXIX (3). Niš: 965–969.
- Nenadović, Konstantin N. (1903) [1883]. Живот и дела великог Ђорђа Петровића Кара-Ђорђа. Vol. I (2 ed.). Belgrade: Штампа Савића и Комп.
- Novaković, Stojan (1904). Ustanak na dahije 1804. Belgrade: Državna štamparija. (Public Domain)
- Pantelić, Dušan (1936) [1935]. "Војно-географски описи Србије: пред Кочину крајину од 1783 и 1784 год". Споменик. LXXXII. У Државној штампарији Краљевне Србије.
- Popović, Radomir J. (2004). "Српско православно монаштво у устаничкој Србији". Богословље. 49 (1–2): 177–192.
- Teinović, Bratislav (2018). "U trouglu velikih sila: Bosna i Hercegovina tokom Prvog srpskog ustanka (1804–1813)". Svarog (17). Nezavisni univerzitet Banja Luka: 43–55 – via CEEOL.
