= Adjutant general =

Military chief administrative officer

A Swedish Army adjutant general in 1807

An adjutant general is a military chief administrative officer.

== France ==
In the French Revolutionary Army, the adjudant-général was a senior staff officer, effectively an assistant to a general officer. It was a special position for lieutenant-colonels and colonels in staff service. Starting in 1795, only colonels could be appointed to the position. It was supplemented by the rank of adjudant-commandant in 1800. In 1803 the position was abolished and adjudants-généraux reverted to the rank of colonel.

== Habsburg Monarchy ==
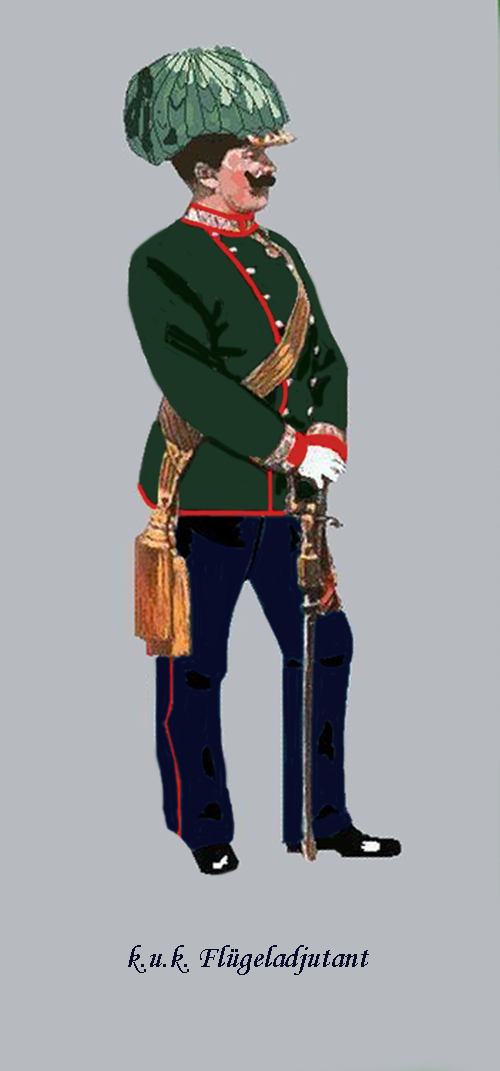
Adjutant of the Emperor from the House of Habsburg

The General Adjutants (generals only) and Wing Adjutants (staff officers only) were used to service the Emperor of the Habsburg Monarchy. The emperor's first general aide had a captain or lieutenant as an officer. Traditionally, the Wing Adjutants did their regular service. From the various branches of the Imperial Army, diligent military personnel were selected and given to the Emperor for election.

The adjutants were then assigned to the emperor in their two to three-year service, formed his constant accompaniment, regulated and monitored the daily program and audiences, and were responsible for the personal file run between the war ministry and the emperor. The service with Emperor Franz Joseph I began for the wing adjutants at three in the morning in full gear because the emperor got up very early. After the imperial breakfast, the adjutant reported to the emperor and presented current reports and the daily program. The service with the emperor was considered very exhausting.

Even today, the head of the House of Habsburg has an adjutant general to assist him with official appointments.

== United Kingdom ==
For over 250 years the Adjutant-General to the Forces was one of the most senior officers in the British Army. He was responsible for developing the Army's personnel policies and supporting its people. Since 2016 the Adjutant-General has been renamed Commander Home Command with different responsibilities.

== United States ==
US Army Adjutant General Corps

In the United States, there are three definitions of this term:

1. The chief administrative officer of the United States Army, who is subordinated to the Army Chief of Staff, and works directly for the Assistant Chief of Staff, G-1, or ACS, G-1 (formerly known as the Deputy Chief of Staff, Personnel, or DCSPER). Formerly a major general position, as of 1984 it is a brigadier general billet. This officer is head of the Adjutant General's Corps and is responsible for the procedures affecting awards and decorations, as well as casualty operations, and for the administration and preservation of records of all army personnel.
2. The chief administrative officer of a major military unit, such as a division, corps, or army. This officer is normally subordinated to the unit chief of staff and is known as the G-1. Although they are called the Adjutant General, they are almost never a general officer and the General part is likely referencing the G in G-1 standing for General Staff.
3. The senior military officer of a state's, commonwealth's, or territory's military forces, including the National Guard (Army National Guard and Air National Guard), the naval militia, and any state defense forces. This officer is known as the "AG" or the "TAG" and reports to the state's chief executive when the National Guard is not in a "federalized" status under Title 10 USC.

== Imperial Russia ==
In Imperial Russia, the adjutant general (Russian: генерал-адъютант / general-adyutant) was an assistant who attended the Tsar, a field marshal, admiral or a general.

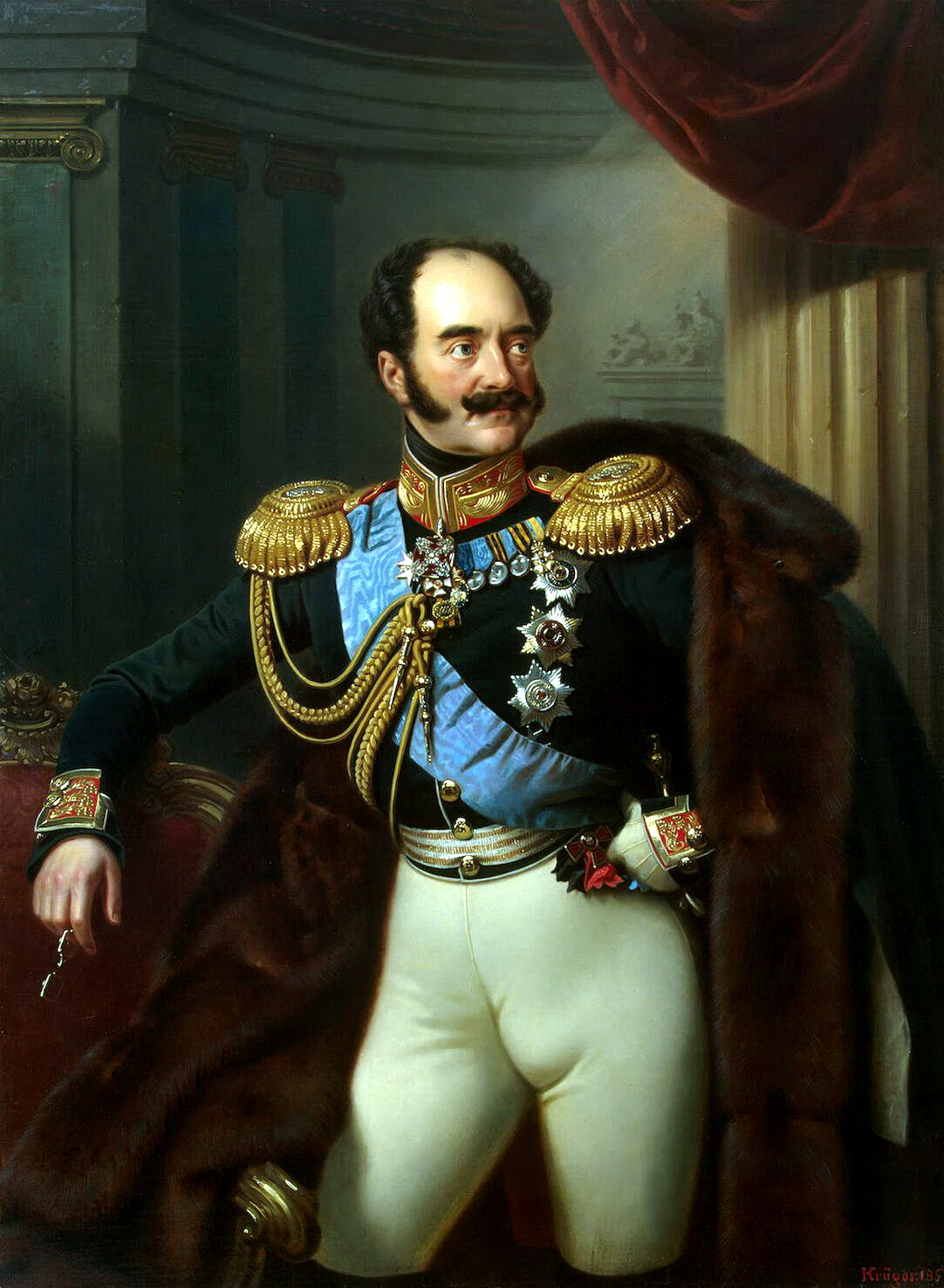
General-adyutant V.F. Adlerberg (IRA)

Rank insignia

- Examples of rank insignia to the dress uniform, to be worn in the Imperial Main Headquarters in 1904

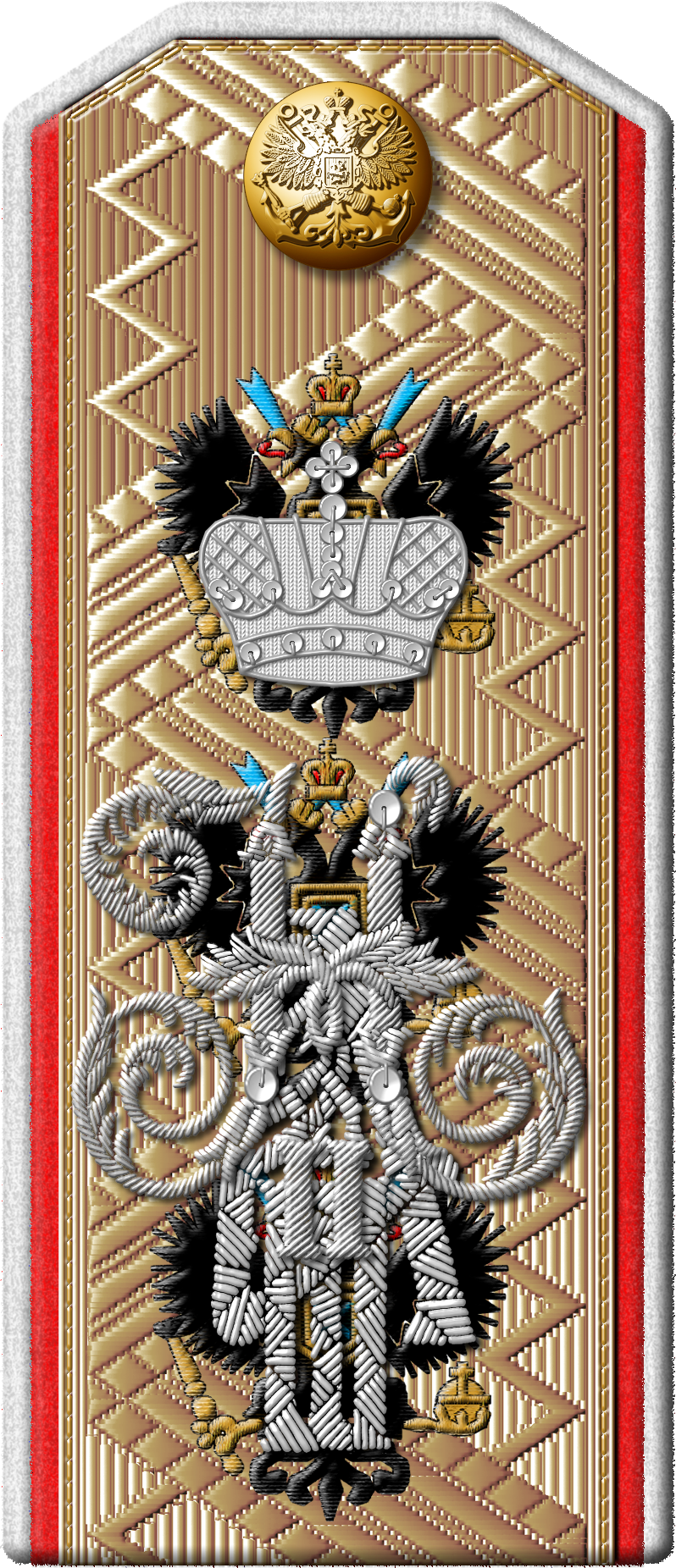
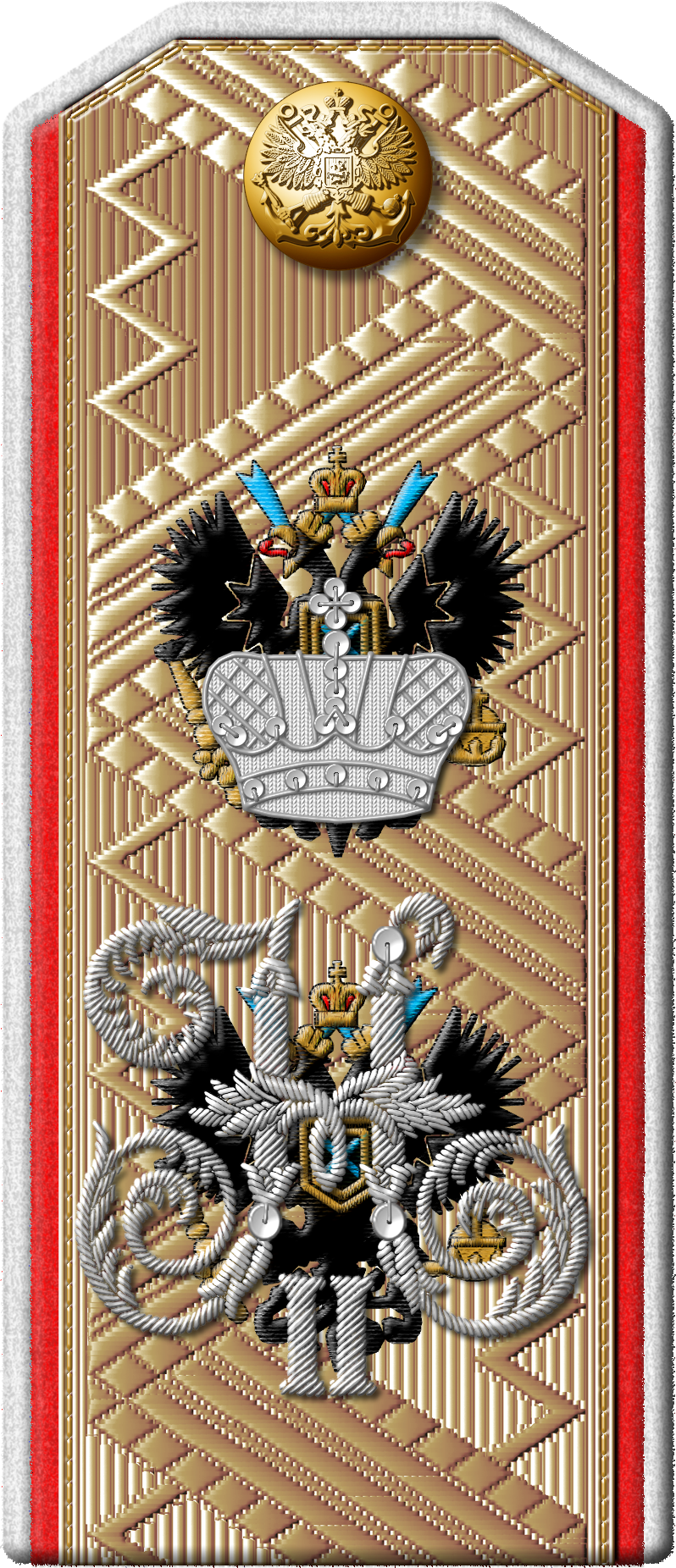
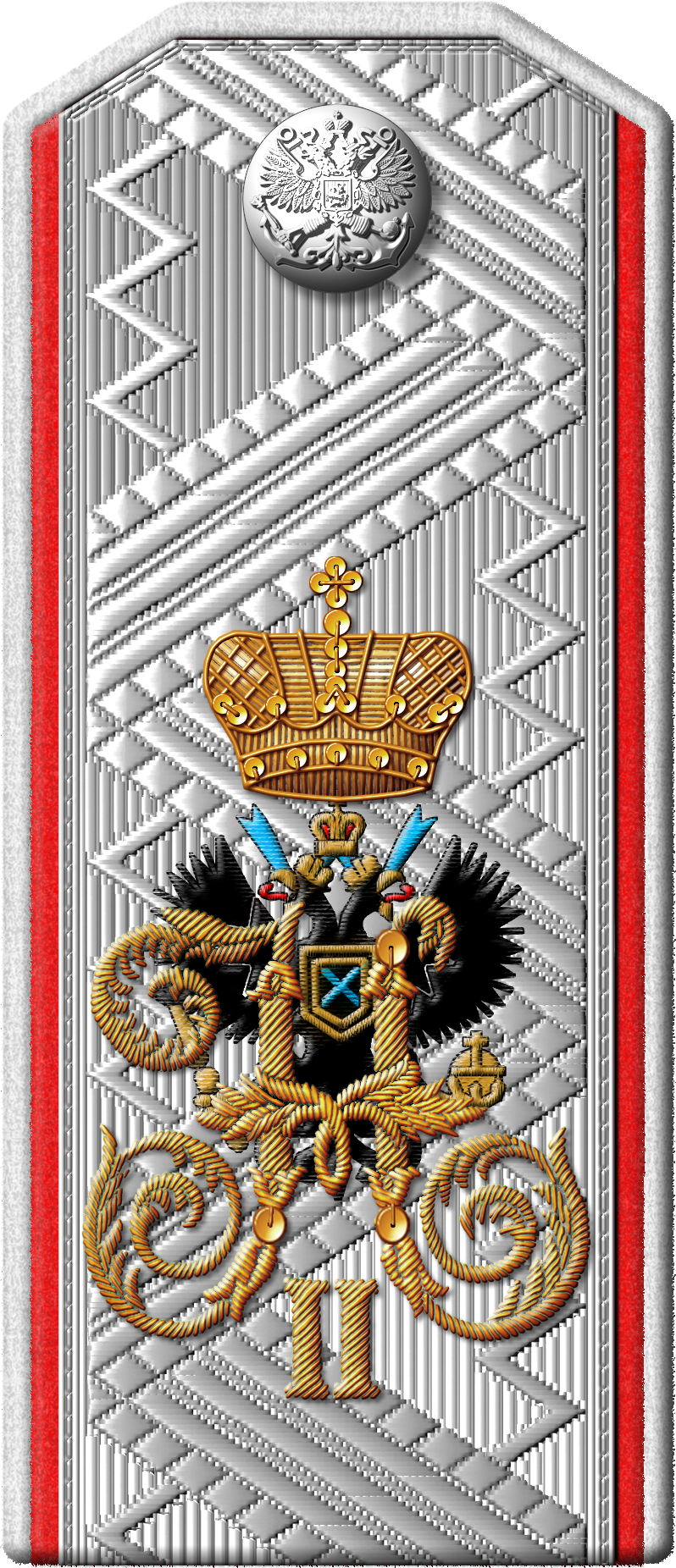
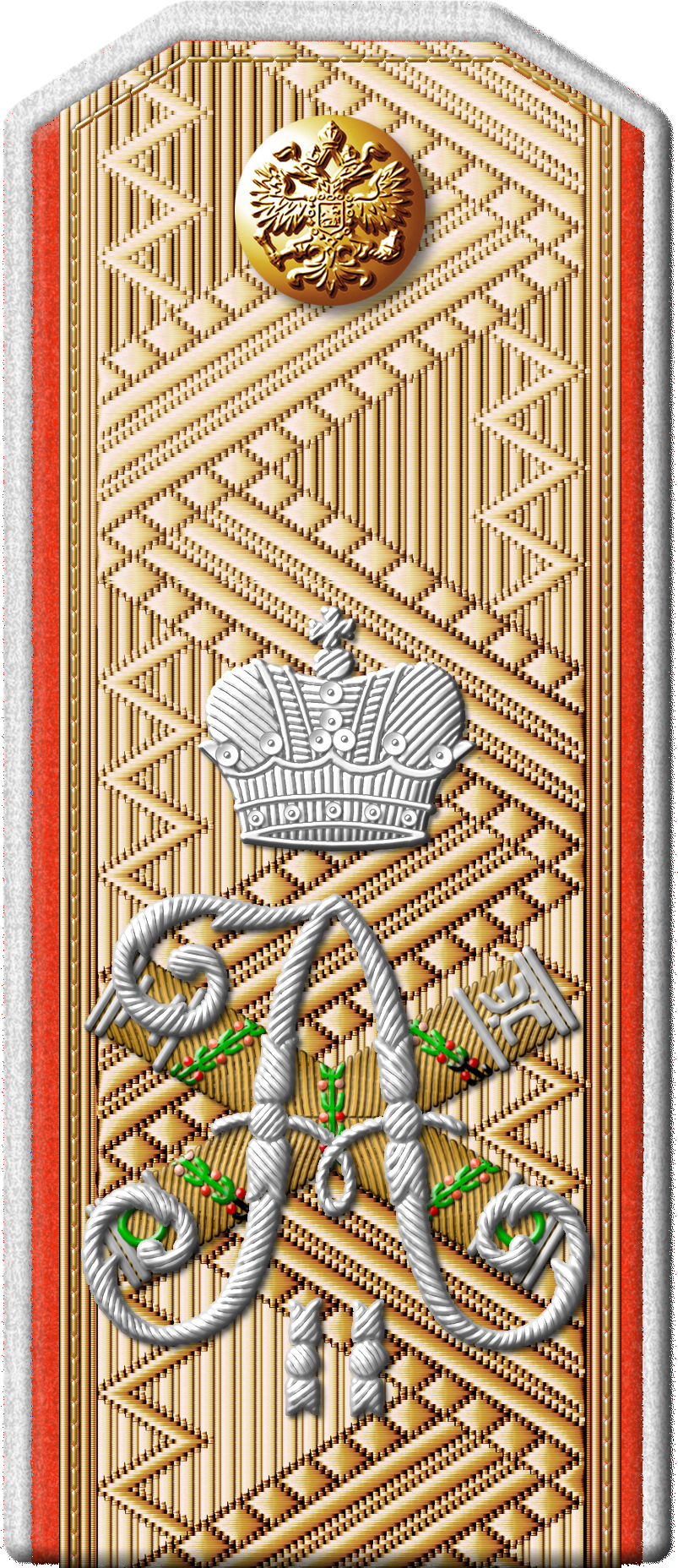
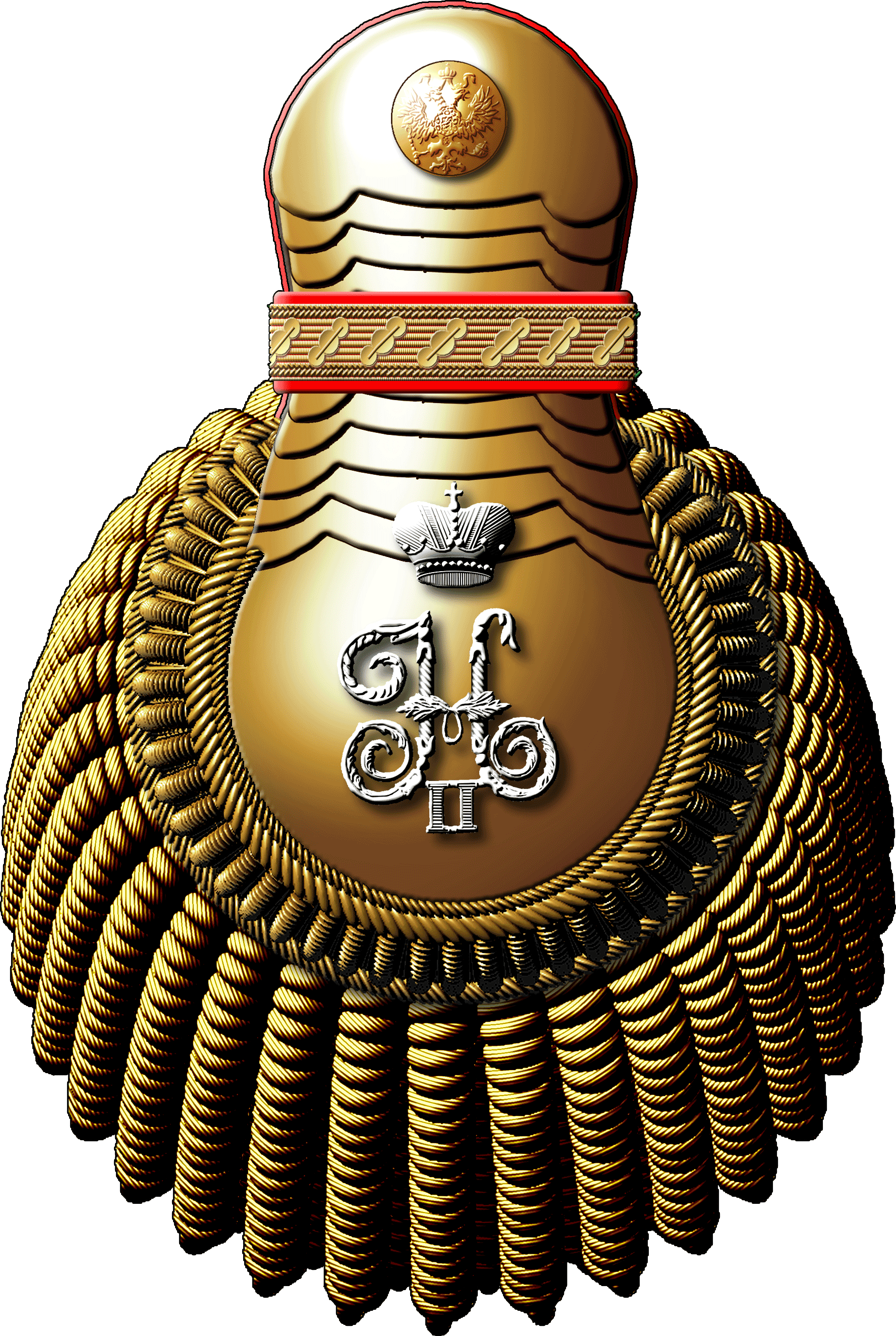
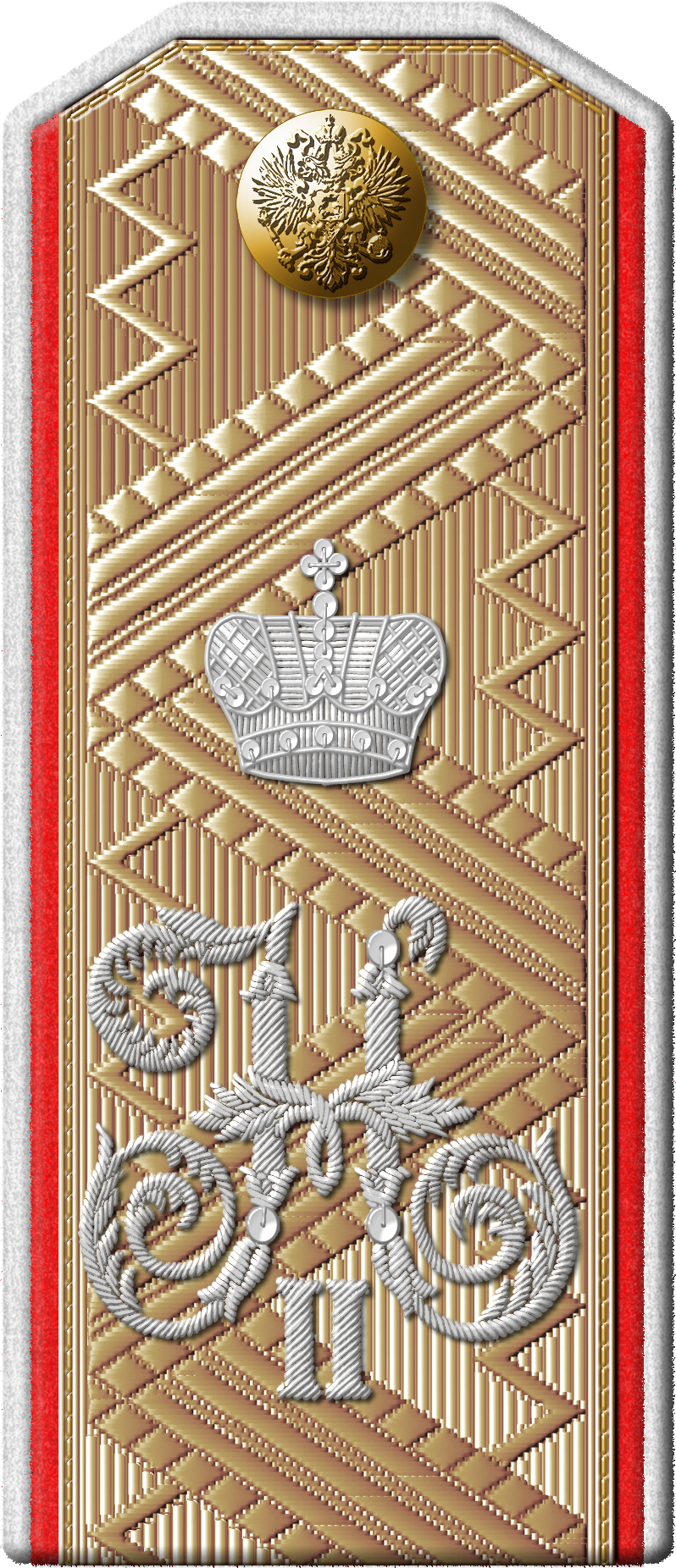
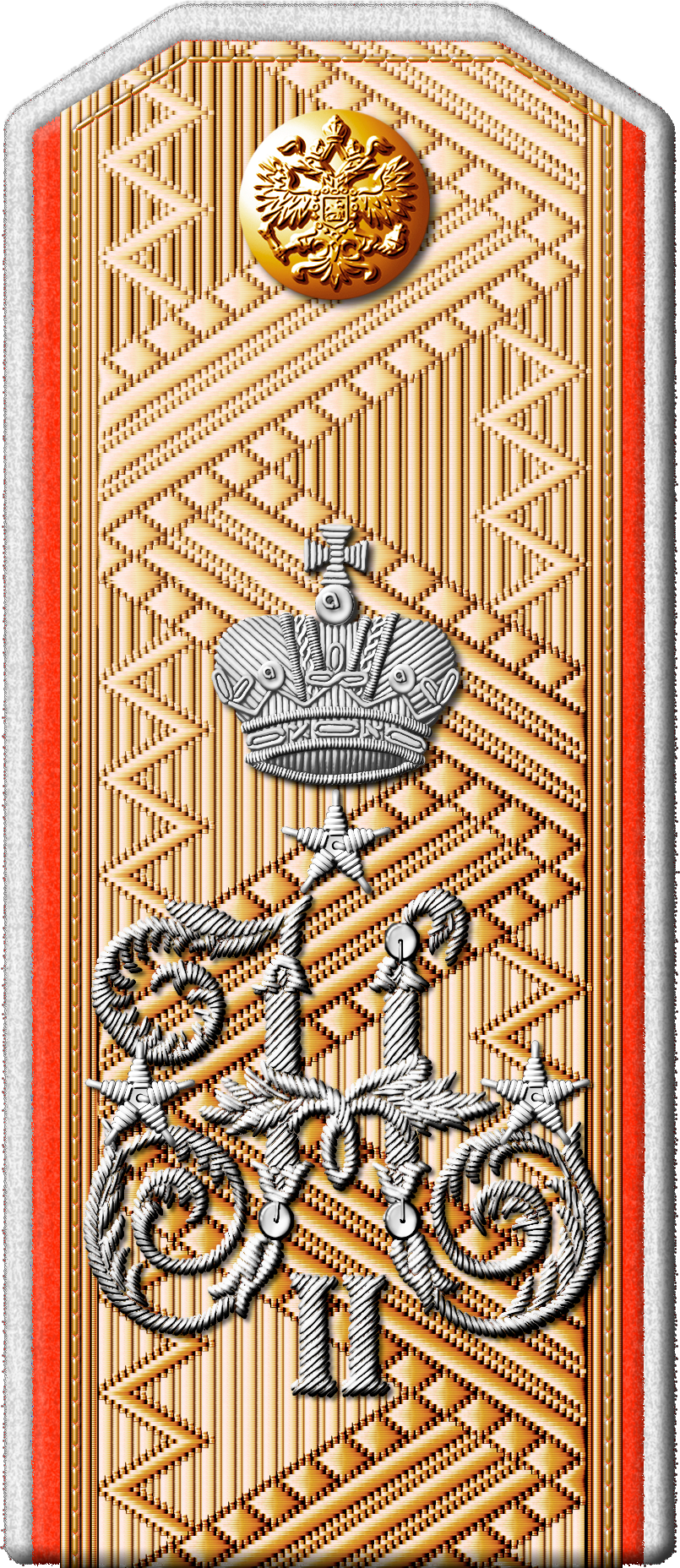
Rank insignia	Adjutant general ...
Shoulder boards Epaulette
Shoulder boards Epaulette	Admiral	Vice admiral	Rear admiral	General field marshal	General of the cavalry	General of the infantry	Lieutenant general
equivalent	OF-7	OF-6	OF-5	OF-10	OF-8	OF-7	OF-6

== Bangladesh ==
In Bangladesh, the adjutant general is one of the four principal staff officers who assist the chief of army staff along with the quartermaster general, and the master general of ordnance of the army. Adjutant general oversees personnel coordination and ensure military law within the army in the country.

== India ==
In India the Adjutant-General is the senior administration officer for the Indian Army and reports to the Chief of Army Staff.

== Pakistan ==
In Pakistan, the Adjutant-General and Judge Advocate General is the army's most senior administration and legal officer.

== Sri Lanka ==
In Sri Lanka the Adjutant-General is the senior administration officer for the Sri Lanka Army and reports to the Commander of the Army. The Adjutant General's (AGs) branch responsible for personal administration, welfare, medical services and rehabilitation.

== See also ==
- Adjutant
