= Imperial Main Headquarters =

19th-century personal military headquarters of the Emperor of All Russia

The Imperial Main Headquarters (Russian: Императорская Главная квартира, Imperatorskaya Glavnaya kvartira) was an organization within the military administration of the Russian Empire that was tasked with carrying out the personal military commands from the Emperor of All Russia.

== History ==
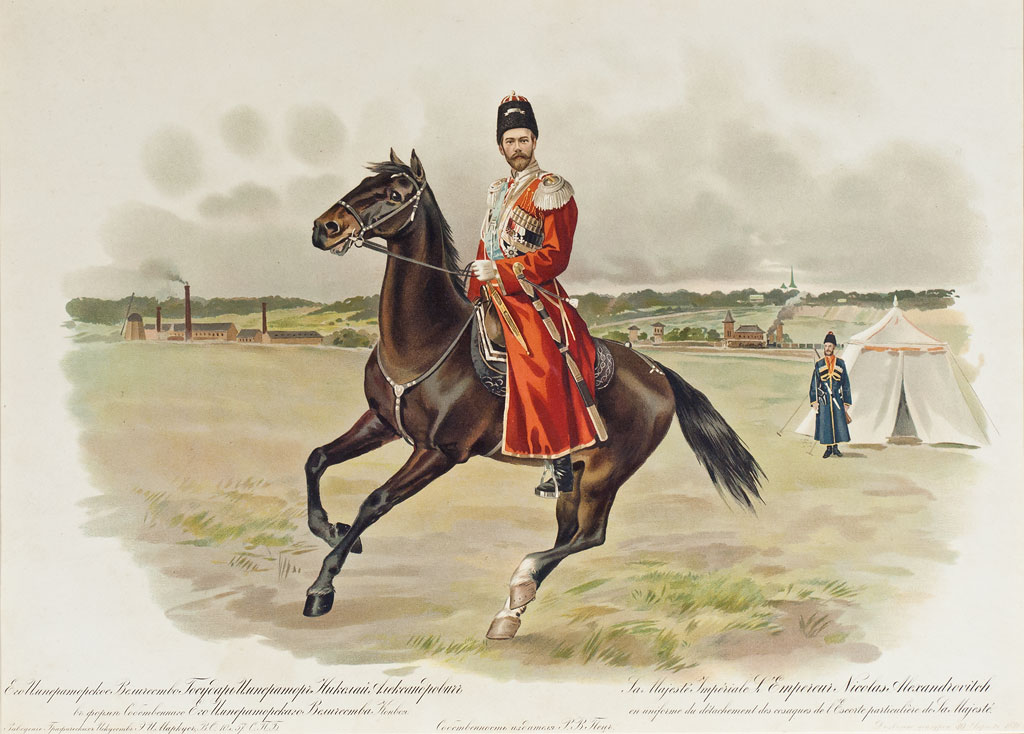
Tsar Nicholas II in the uniform of the Convoy His Majesty

The Main Headquarters was established in early 1813 during the War of the Sixth Coalition against France, in connection with the arrival of Alexander I at the front. It was tasked with accompanying the emperor on campaigns, the management of the imperial retinue, and presenting reports on the military situation in the absence of the War Ministry. From 1826 until 1839 the role of commander of the Imperial Main Headquarters was combined with that of the commander of the Special Corps of Gendarmes. It later became an independent position. In 1832, within the Chancellery of the War Ministry was established the Military Campaign Chancellery of His Imperial Majesty. That organization was the main body of the headquarters. Two years later it was made a completely independent organization, and from 1856 until 1867 the roles of the commanders of the headquarters and of the Military Campaign Chancellery were combined. From 1867 the latter position was abolished and then from 1855 until 1881 within the headquarters there was also a personal chancellery of the Tsarevich (crown prince). Commander of Main Headquarters once again became the overall head. In 1883 the Military Campaign Chancellery and the Directorate of the Imperial Main Headquarters were combined in to the Chancellery of the Imperial Main Headquarters, which itself in 1904 was renamed into the Military Campaign Chancellery of His Imperial Majesty, and in 1908—the Military Campaign Chancellery of His Imperial Majesty within the Imperial Main Headquarters. From 1908 until 1909, a separate Naval Campaign Chancellery of His Imperial Majesty existed within the organization. The Imperial Main Headquarters was dissolved in 1917 during the Russian Revolution.

== Rank insignia Imperial Main Headquarter ==
Examples of rank insignia to the dress uniform of Adjutant generals, 1894-1917

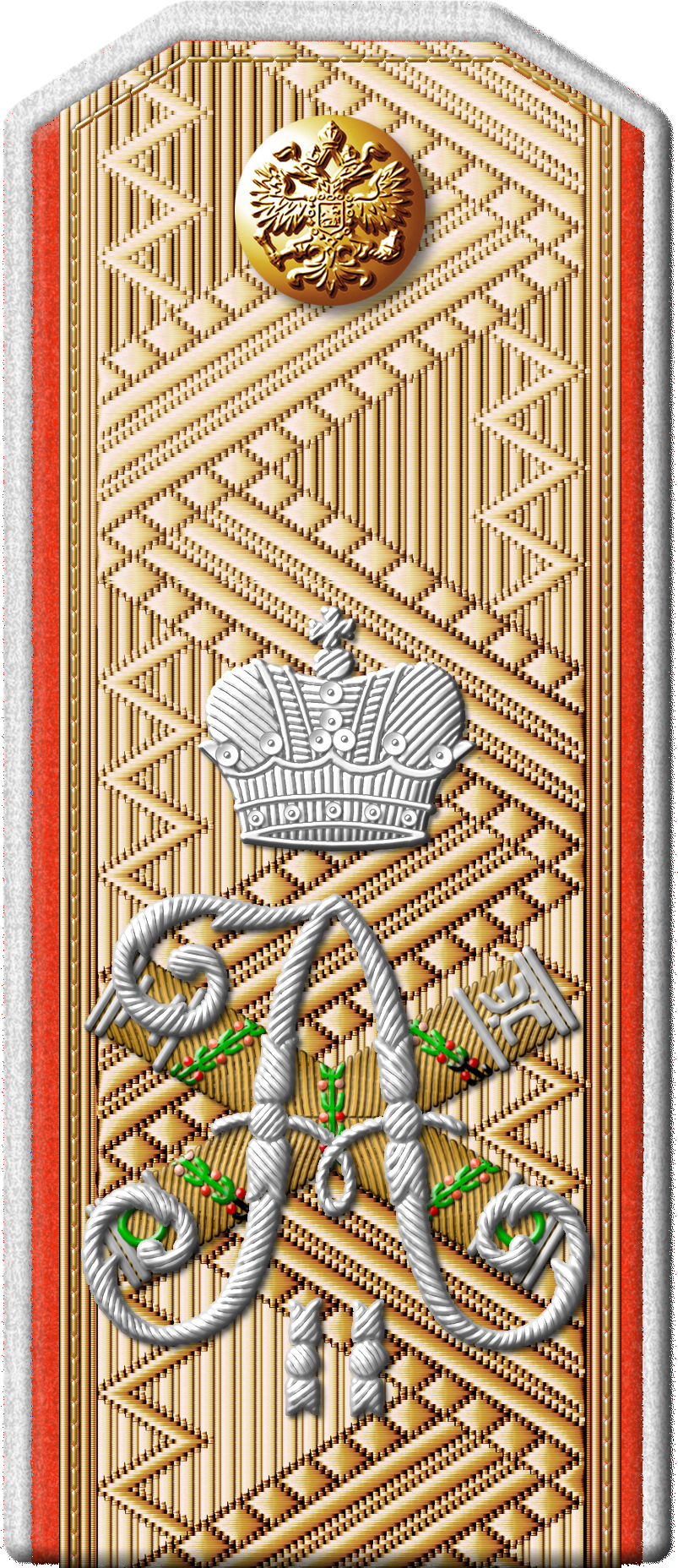
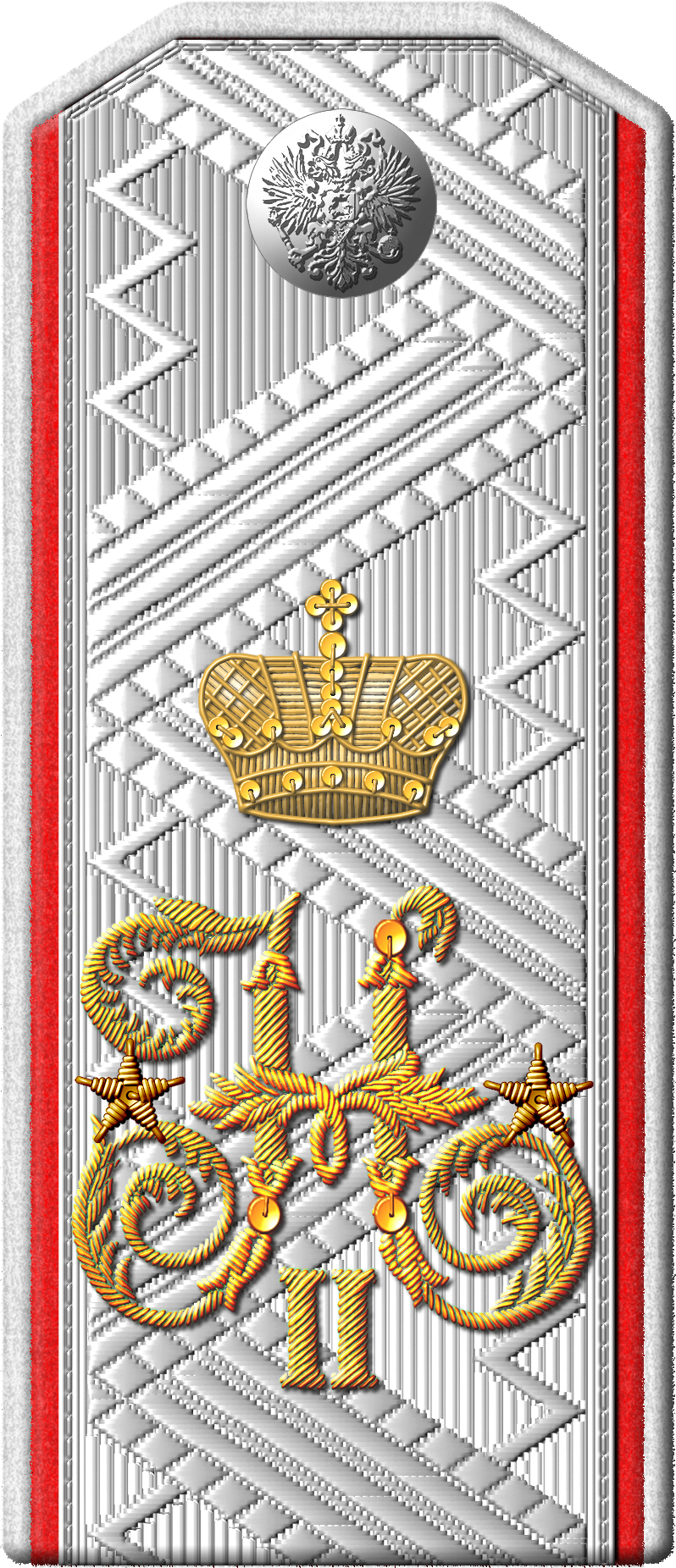
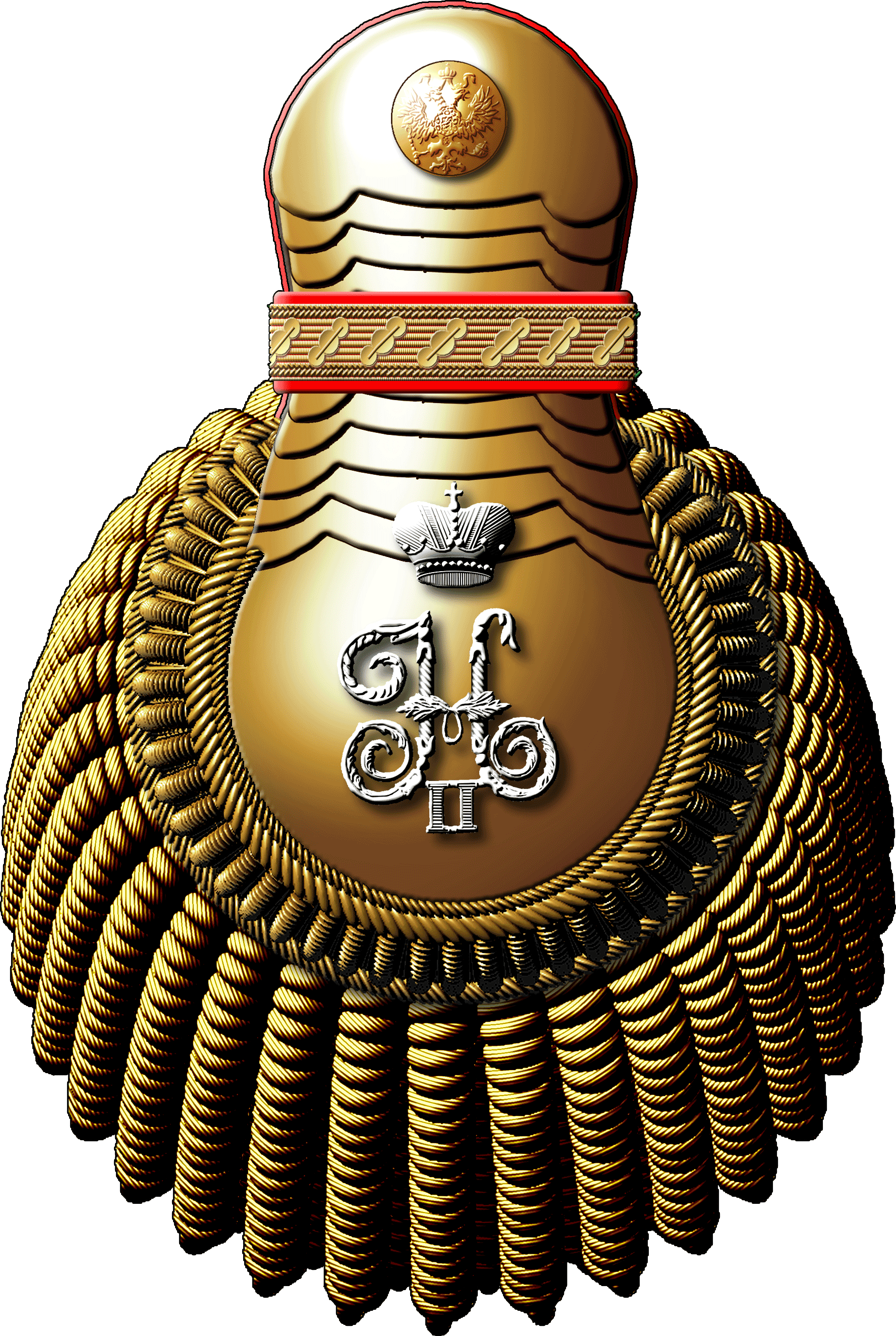
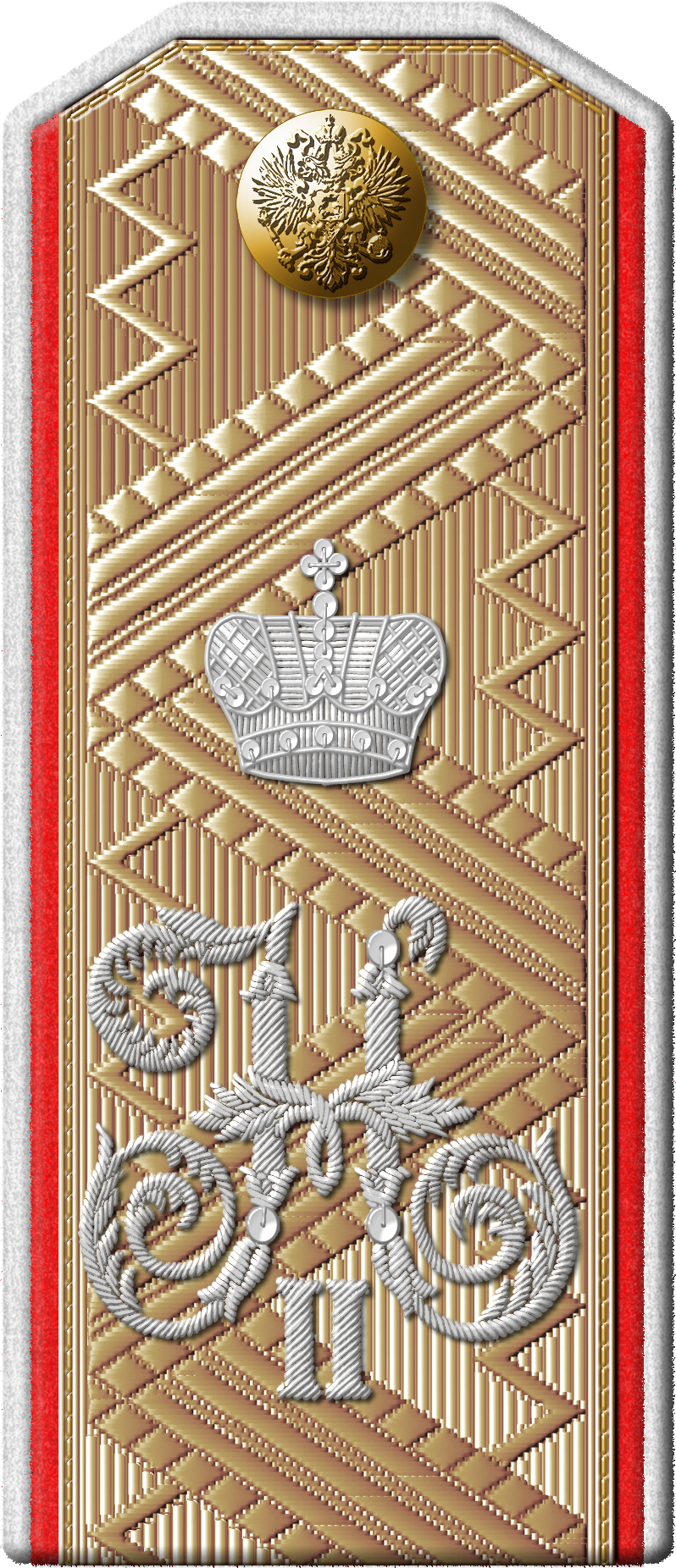
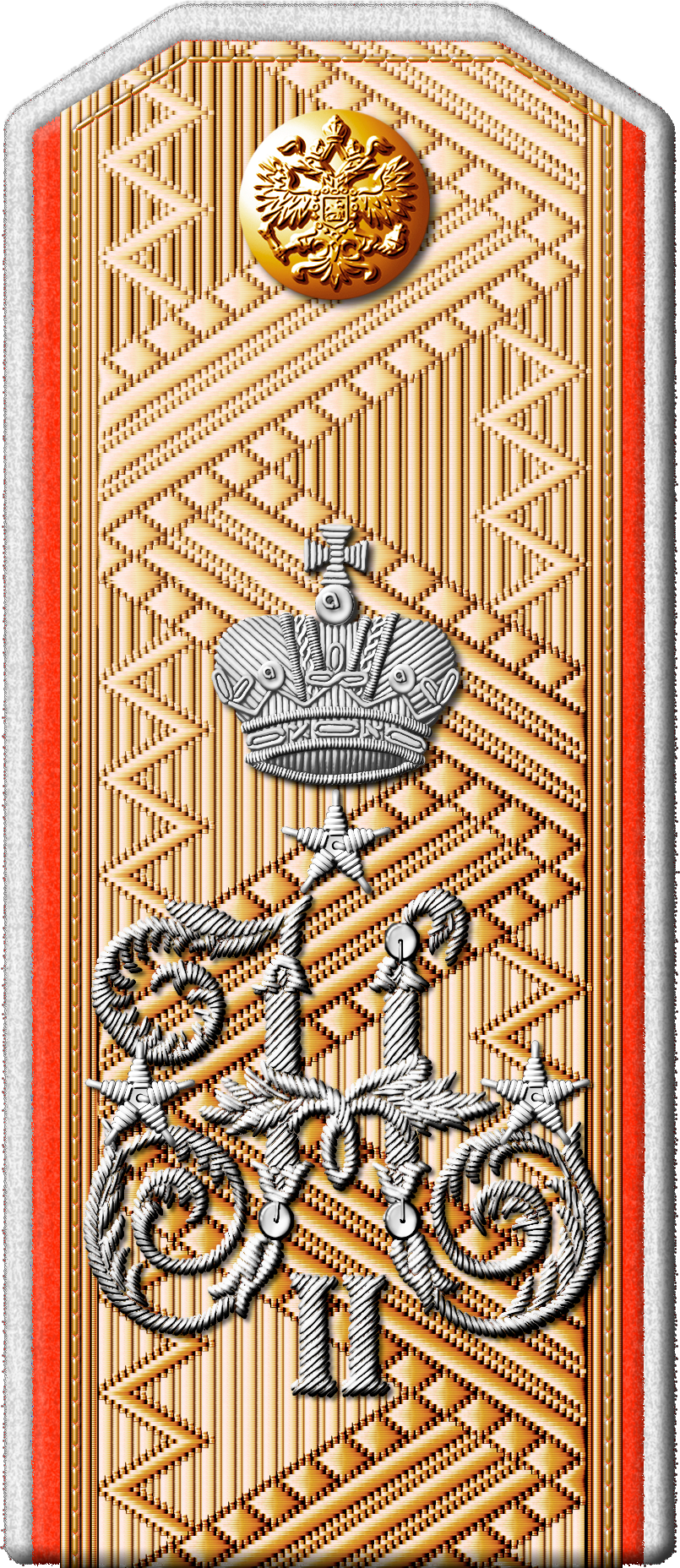
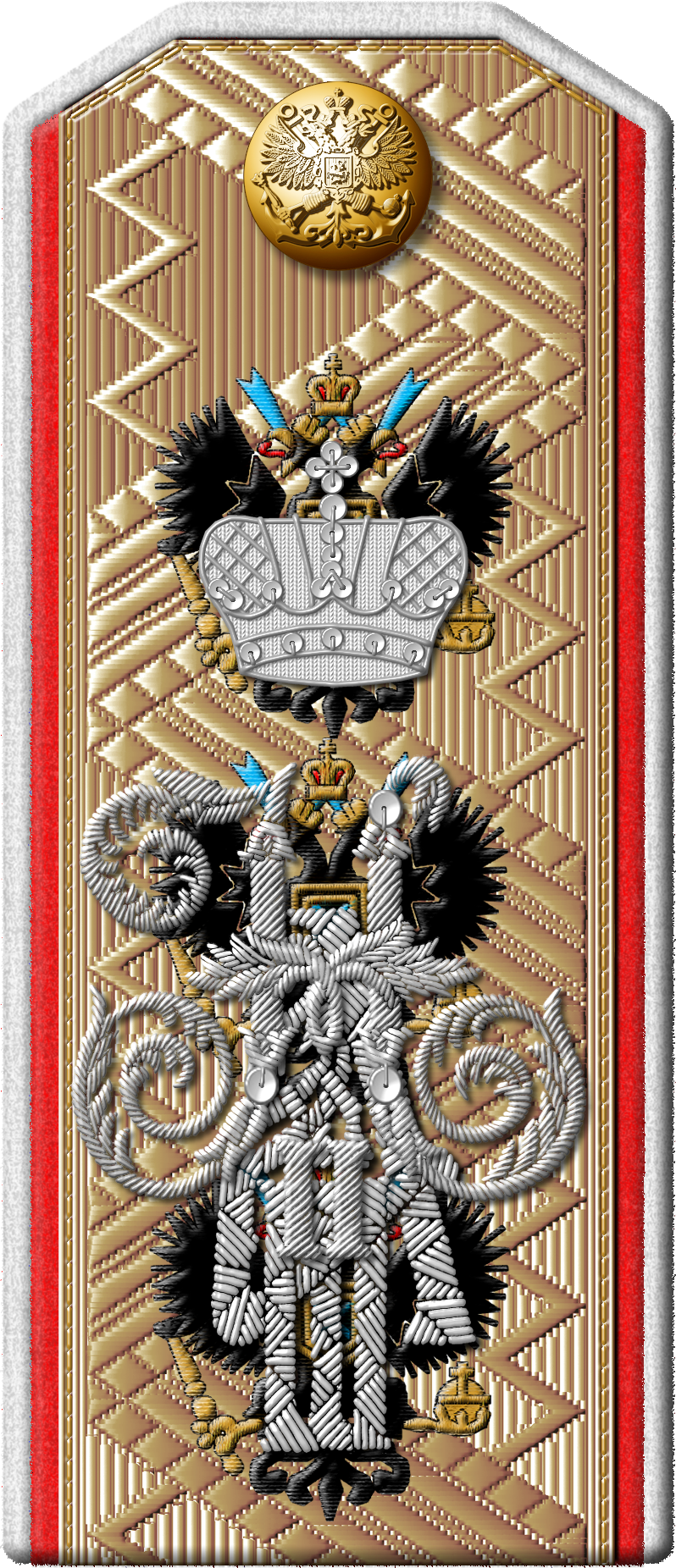
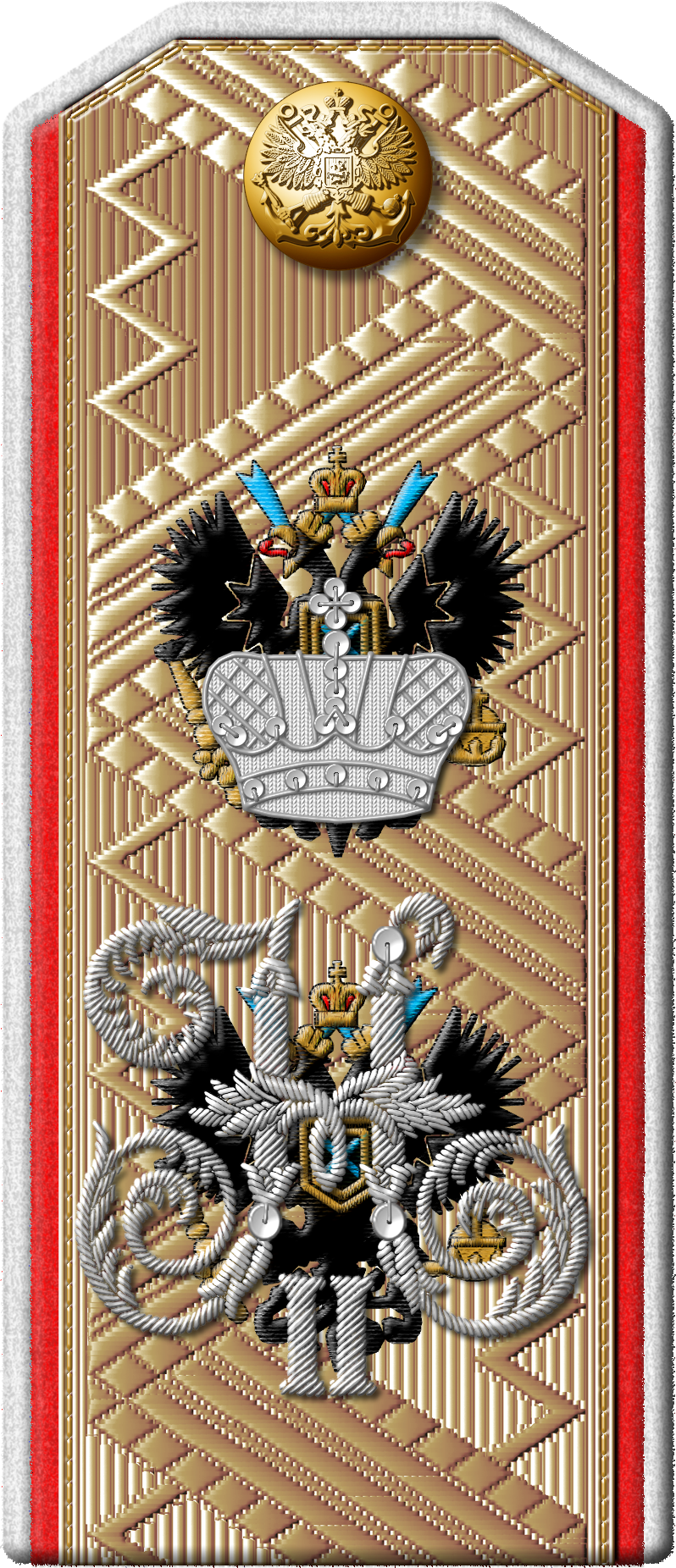
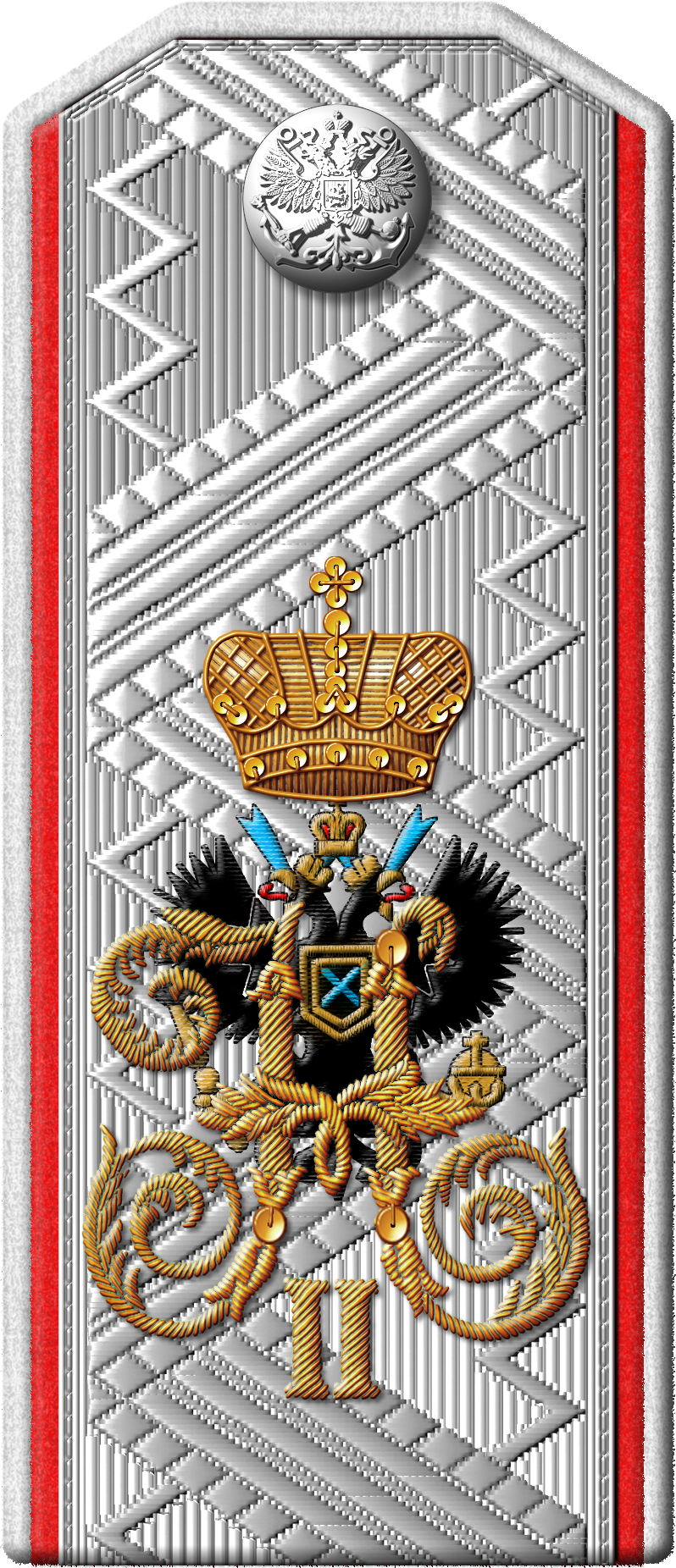
Rank insignia	Adjutant general ...
Shoulder boards Epaulette
Shoulder boards Epaulette	General field marshal	General ...	General of the cavalry	General of the infantry	Lieutenant general	Admiral	Vice admiral	Rear admiral
equivalent	OF-10	OF-8		OF-7	OF-6	OF-7	OF-6	OF-5

== Structure ==
- Military Campaign Chancellery
- Naval Campaign Chancellery
- Chancellery of Appeals
- Personal Convoy of His Imperial Majesty
