= Platzmajor =

Platzmajor or Placemajor (from French: major de place) was an officer rank designated to the officer in charge of police duties in a garrison or fortress. It was used in the German Empire, Habsburg Monarchy, Russia and Sweden until the 19th century.

In German, it is one of several fortress officer ranks known as Platzoffizier.
