= Čemerno =

Mountain in Serbia

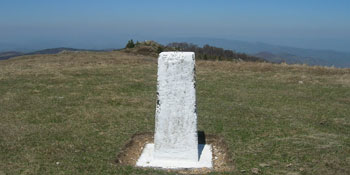
- Smrdljuč Peak

Highest point
- Elevation: 1,579 m (5,180 ft)
- Coordinates: 43°34′57″N 20°25′32″E

Geography
- Location within Serbia
- Location: Southwestern Serbia
- Parent range: Dinaric Alps

Čemerno (Serbian Cyrillic: Чемерно) is a mountain in southwestern Serbia, to the south of the city of Kraljevo. Its highest peak Smrdljuč has an elevation of 1,579 m (5,180 ft) above sea level.

== Geography ==
From the south, mountain plato Čemerno is limited by the valley of the river Studenica, and from the north by the valleys of the rivers Dubočica and Borošnica. Mountain plato extends in the northwest-southeast direction for some 12 kilometers and in it far southeast end it turns southwards. Mountain slopes are carved by tributaries of the rivers Ibar and Studenica. The mountain highest peak is Smrdljuč (1579 m), other peaks are: Goleš (1348 m), Gvozdac (1456 m), Rudo brdo (1454 m), Gusarica (1535 m), Tičije brdo (1430 m).

Remarkably scenic parts of the mountain plato are the spring areas northeast of high point Gusarica (1535 m) in the area of the village of Bresnik where the ridge of the mountain Čemerno is significantly narrowed. In this areas under the peaks, there are many springs, the most important of which are: Kadina voda, below the summit of Gvozdac (1456 m), and Zmajevac spring , between Smrdljuč (1579 m) and Rudo brdo (1454 m) summits. The most accessible and well known spring is located at 700 m above sea level in Odmenje village - the famous Sava water, widely known for its healing properties.

Most of the mountain is covered with mixed forest, but in some parts of the ridge there are small or large grassland pastures with cattle huts.

A road leads through the western parts of the mountain, which then descends in the north to the villages of Tolišnica, in the upper part of the Borošnica Valley, to the area of the village of Savovo, and to Maglič, in the Ibar Valley. There are many more cattle huts on the south side of Čemerno and they rise high along the mountain sides above the houses of the villages of Savovo and Đakovo.

== See also ==
- List of mountains in Serbia
