= Stevan Palalija =

Serb knez and militia commander

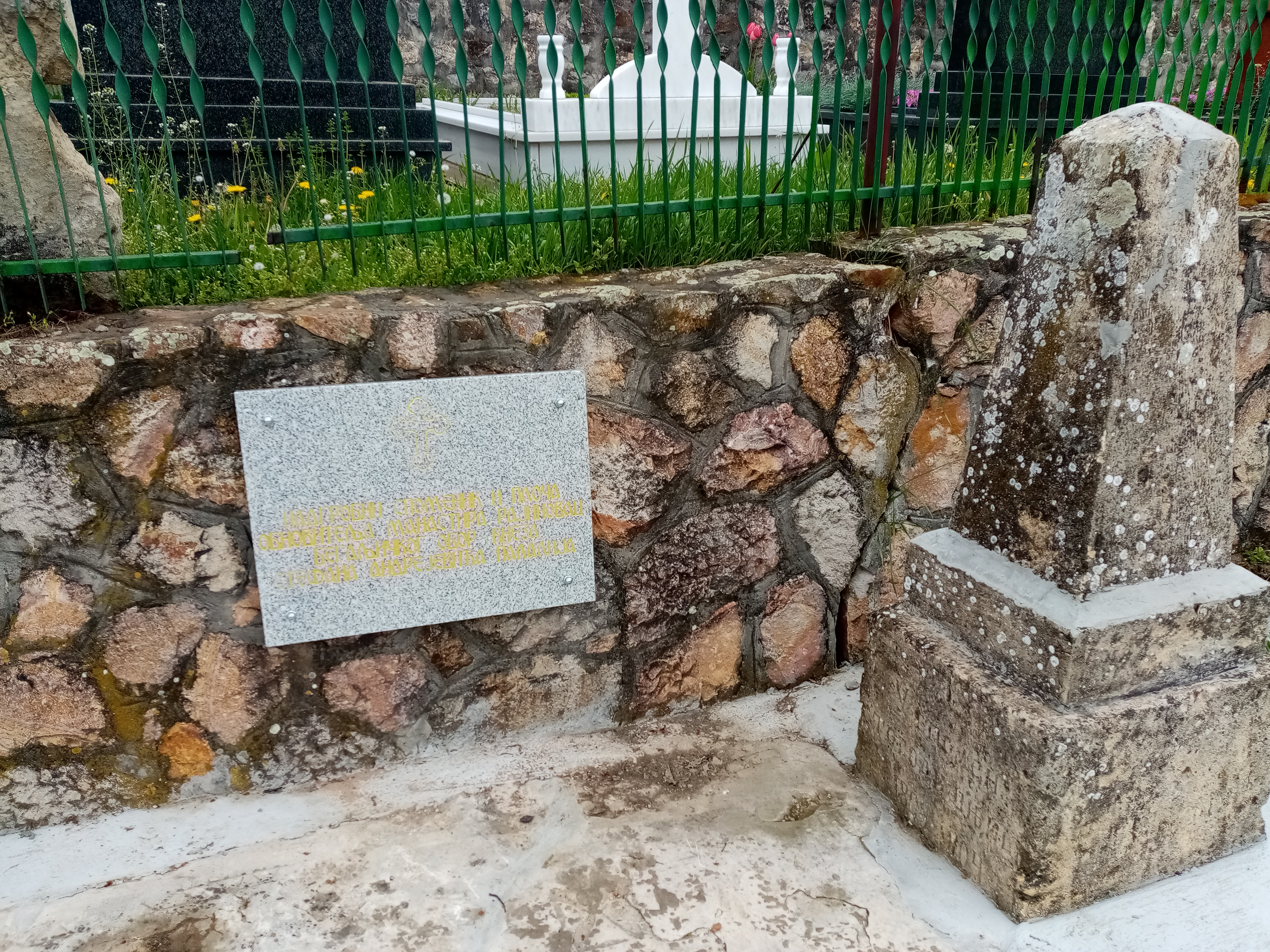
- Grave of Palalija at the Rajinovac monastery
- Born: Begaljica, Ottoman Empire
- Died: Late January 1804; Grocka, Ottoman Empire
- Cause of death: Murdered during Slaughter of the Knezes
- Resting place: Rajinovac monastery
- Occupation: knez (or obor-knez) of Begaljica
- Known for: Serb rural leader in Belgrade nahiya; Serb militia member; victim in the Slaughter of the Knezes
- Movement: Serb conspiratory group in the Belgrade Pashalik
- Opponent: Dahije

Stevan Andrejić (Serbian: Стеван Андрејић, fl. 1793–d. 1804), known as Palalija (Стеван Палалија), was a Serb village mayor (obor-knez) in Begaljica in the Grocka nahiya (district) of the Belgrade Pashalik. He was among the conspirators in 1803 to overthrow the tyrannical Dahije. He was murdered during Slaughter of the Knezes, being one of the first victims.

== Life ==
Andrejić was born in the village of Begaljica in the Belgrade nahiya, close to Grocka. According to Rista T. Nikolić (1903), the Palalić family in Begaljica originated from four brothers, but it is unknown when they settled and from where; Stevan belonged to this family. According to G. Desnica (1979), he married into the local Palalić family, and was thus nicknamed Palalija. He was an influential merchant. Palalija sponsored the renovation of the Rajinovac monastery (and is thus regarded a ktetor), when the Studenica archimandrite Gerasim Studeničanin stayed here, returning the relics of King Stefan the First-Crowned from Syrmia to Serbia, and hiding them from the Turks. The original church was mentioned in 1528, but was destroyed, and later rebuilt and completed in 1793, with the help of archimandrite Gerasim, hieromonk Meletije, knez "Stefan" (Palalija), Dimitrije Stefanović, with the blessing of Sultan Selim III and Belgrade Metropolitan Methodios.

Palalija was an obor-knez during the tenure of Belgrade Vizier Hadji Mustafa Pasha (t. 1793–1801). As such, he was one of the knezes that mustered Serbian militiamen against the renegade Janissaries and Vidin Pasha Osman Pazvantoglu. He was one of the most notable knezes throughout the Pashalik, alongside Aleksa Nenadović, Ilija Birčanin, Nikola Grbović of the Valjevo nahiya, Ranko Lazarević of the Šabac nahiya, Nikola of the Rudnik nahiya, Petar of the Ćuprija nahiya, and others. Hadji Mustafa Pasha was murdered by the Janissaries in 1801.

In 1803 there were conspiracies to throw off the tyrannical rule of the Dahije (the renegade Janissary leadership), Palalija supporting hajduk leader Stanoje Glavaš's band and Karađorđe's call for uprising. He was to ready the Grocka nahija for war, and bought weapons which he instructed villagers on how to use. Palalija was part of an ammunition smuggling network from Austria, to be used in the fight against the Dahije. A German found a list of Serb conspirators, which he gave over to the Dahije in Belgrade; among those on the list were Palalija. Learning of the conspiracies, the Dahije decided to kill Serb leaders in order to thwart a rebellion against them, force the Serbs into total submission, and continue ruling the pashalik. According to epic poetry, Dahije leader Mehmed-aga Fočić despised Palalija and wanted to murder him, as he acted like "he was the pasha, and I only the subaša". The Dahije leaders gave orders to their mütesellims and others, such as Dahije henchmen and innkeepers, to kill Serb leaders, but eventually the Dahije leaders themselves set out from Belgrade to carry out murders of selected people, thus, Mehmed-aga Fočić went for Valjevo and Šabac nahiyas, Kučuk-Alija went for Smederevo, Ćuprija and Jagodina nahiyas, Mula-Jusuf went to Belgrade and Grocka nahiyas, while Aganlija seems to have stayed in Belgrade. Palalija was among the first victims, along with knezes Marko J. Čarapić and Stanoje Mihailović. The guslar (bard) Filip Višnjić (1767–1834) sang about Palalija as the first victim, being lured and cut down in Grocka. Among other Grocka nahiya notables killed were knez Čarapić and militia buljubaša (captain) Janko Gagić. The Slaughter of the Knezes led to the First Serbian Uprising and beginning of the Serbian Revolution.

Palalija was buried at the eastern side of the Rajinovac monastery, with the gravestone mentioning him as "obor-knez of Begaljica", erected by Mija Janković in 1804. M. Milićević (1831–1908) said of him, "the simple earth that covers him, he redeemed with his blood". His son Rista was buried beside him. A commemorative plaque was set up by his grave on 4 July 1954 by the Institute for Cultural Heritage.

== See also ==
- First Serbian Uprising

== Annotations ==
1. Здѣ почиваєть рабъ божи Стефанъ Андреићъ Оборкнезъ бегаличкій . Пострада и погибе за ристяне . Богъ да прости нѣму душу . Подписа ову плочу Мія Янковићъ 1804.

== Sources ==
- Desnica, Gojko (1979). "КНЕЗ СТЕВАН АНДРЕЈИЋ ПАЛАЛИЈА". Velikani Srbije u XVIII i XIX veku. Izdavačka ustanova Srpska čitaonica i knjižnica. pp. 403–404.
- Gavrilović, Andra (1904). "Сеча кнезова". Црте из историје ослобођења Србије. Belgrade: Нздање дворске књижаре Мите Стајића у Београду. pp. 7–42 – via Archive.org.
- Milićević, Milan Đ. (1888). Поменик знаменитих људи у српског народа новијега доба. Издање Чупићеве задужбине. pp. 494–495 – via Archive.org.
- Milićević, Milan Đ. (1867). "Манастири у Србији". Гласник српског ученог друштва. IV (XXI). у Државној штампарији: 1–97 – via Google Books.
- Nenadović, Matija (1893). Kovačević, Ljubomir (ed.). Мемоари Матије Ненадовића [Memoirs of Matija Nenadović]. Srpska književna zadruga – via Archive.org.
- Nikolić, Rista T. (1903). "17. Bregalnica". ОКОЛИНА БЕОГРАДА. Српски етнографски зборник 5, Насеља српских земаља 2. Srpska kraljevska akademija.
- Novaković, Stojan (1904). Устанак на дахије 1804 [Uprising against the Dahije]. Штампано у Државној штампарији – via Archive.org.
- Pantelić, Dušan (1949). Београдски пашалук пред Први српски устанак (1794–1804). Belgrade: Српска академија наука.
- Vukićević, Milenko M. (1907). Карађорђе (1752–1804) [Karađorđe]. Vol. 1. Државна штампарија Краљевине Србије – via Archive.org.
- "Споменик културе од великог значајa: Манастир Рајиновац, Бегаљица" [Cultural Monument of Great Value: Rajinovac Monastery, Begaljica]. Завод за заштиту споменика културе града Београда [Cultural Heritage Preservation Institute of Belgrade].
