= House of Venijamin Marinković =

Coordinates: 43°25′21″N 20°22′44″E

The house of Venijamin Marinković Кућа у којој је живео Венијамин Маринковић Kuća u kojoj je živeo Venijamin Marinković
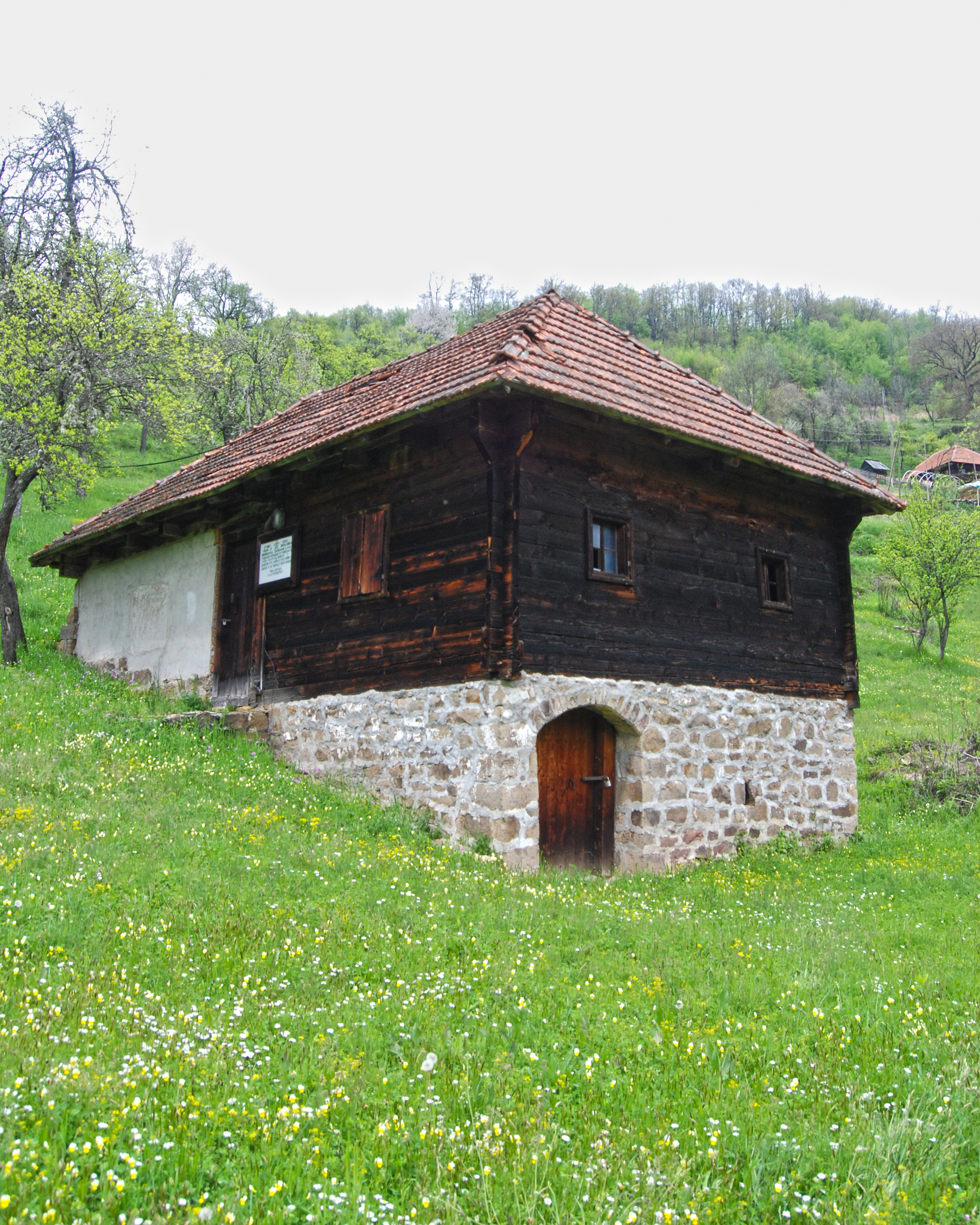
- The house of Venijamin Marinković.

Religion
- Leadership: Institute for Cultural Heritage Preservation Kraljevo

Location
- Location: Ivanjica, Serbia
- Interactive map of The house of Venijamin Marinković; Кућа у којој је живео Венијамин Маринковић; Kuća u kojoj je živeo Venijamin Marinković

Website
- http://zavodkraljevo.rs/

The house of Venijamin Marinković is located in the village of Devići in Ivanjica.

The house of Venijamin Marinković is an example of rural architecture in villages that are located at the foot of the mountain of Golija. Today, the monument is enlisted as an immovable cultural property.

== Venijamin Marinković ==
Political activist Venijamin Marinković was born and lived in this house in the interwar period. He was one of the leaders of the armed uprising against the occupation of Yugoslavia in the Užice region. He was a teacher and a commander in the uprising. In the beginning of year 1941 he was a member of The District Committee that was located in Užice, together with Zelimir Djuric Zeljo, Vukola Dabic, Dobrilo Petrovic, Mihajlo Jevtic and Radoje Maric. He was killed in 1941 in Pozega.
