= Begaljica =

Begaljica Бегаљица
- Rural settlement (village)
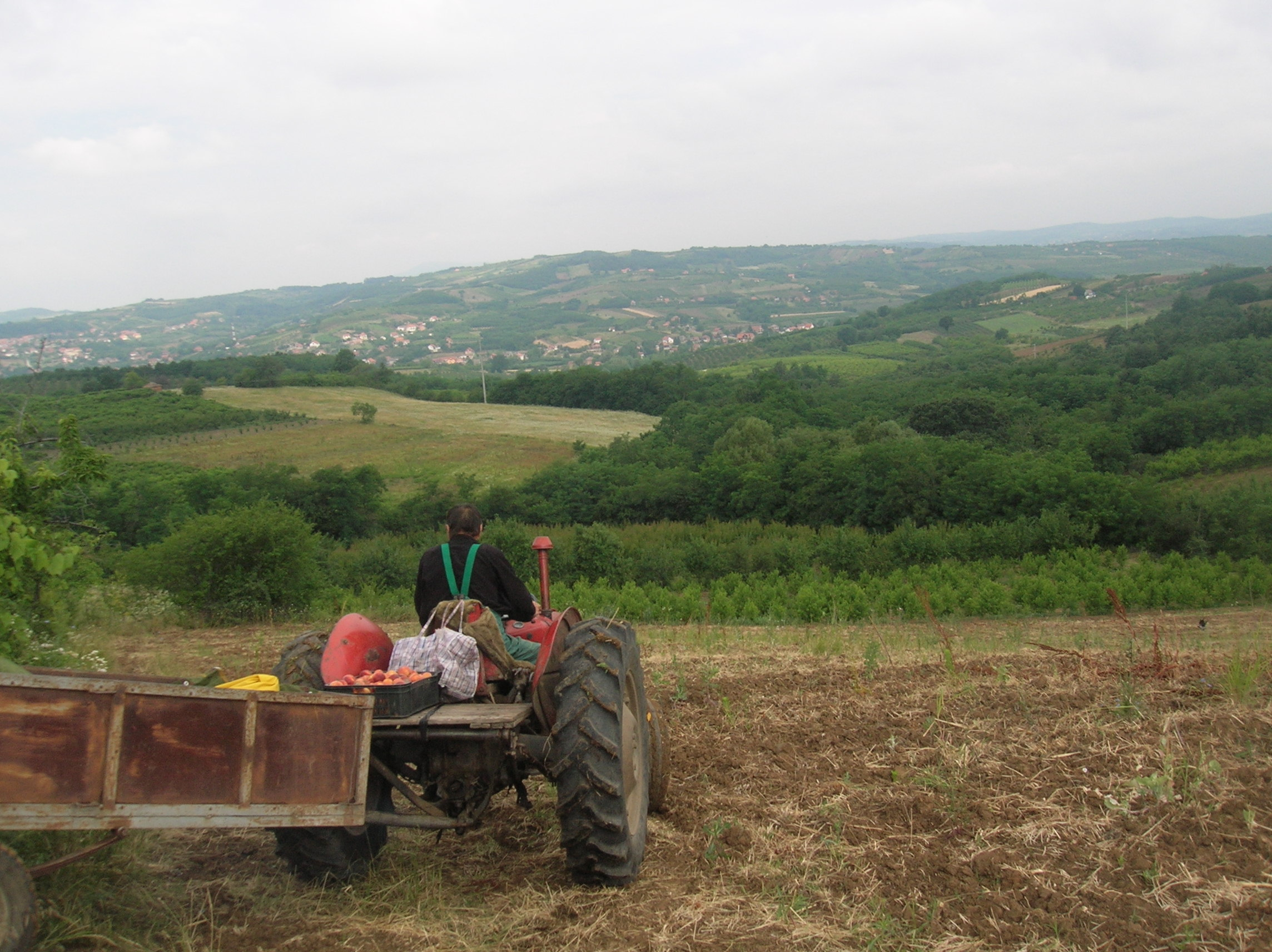
- Rajinovac

- Location within Serbia
- Coordinates: 44°38′N 20°42′E
- Country: Serbia
- District: Belgrade
- Municipality: Grocka
- First mention: 1528

Area
  - Total: 12.03 sq mi (31.17 km^{2})
- Elevation: 351 ft (107 m)

Population (2002)
  - Total: 3,255
  - Estimate (2011): 8,233
- Time zone: UTC+1 (CET)
  - Summer (DST): UTC+2 (CEST)
- Postal code: 11308
- Area code: 011
- Car plates: BG

Begaljica (Serbian Cyrillic: Бегаљица (Бегаљица)) is a rural settlement in the Grocka municipality of eastern Belgrade, Serbia. It is one of 15 settlements of Grocka, situated in its centre, with a population of 8,233 according to the 2011 preliminary census. The village is located at the water source of the Begaljica river, a tributary of the Danube, thus in the southern half of Podunavlje, as well as in the fertile Šumadija region of central Serbia.

Begaljica was first mentioned in 1528, seven years after the Ottoman conquest of Serbia, as having 5 families, and the Rajinovac monastery on the hill above the village. As the region was located on the Ottoman-Habsburg war frontier, villages were constantly destroyed and deserted. In fact, the village of Begaljica (literally "fleeing town") derived its name from these events. In January 1804, a notable knez (Serb mayor) from the village, Stevan Andrejić-Palalija, was killed during the "Slaughter of the Knezes" by the renegade Janissaries known as the Dahije. This event sparked the First Serbian Uprising. In 1902, an anthropogeographical study registered some 200 houses and 17 clans as living in Begaljica. The village is based on agriculture, namely fruits and viticulture, with 38,6% of the population being agrarian in 1991.

== Etymology ==
The name Begaljica is derived from the Serbian word begal (begalj), meaning "fleeing". According to locals, it is derived from the fact that the Ottomans constantly attacked and seized the village, forcing the population to flee. When the Ottomans left, villagers would return. This is how the village received its name. In Turkish sources Begaljica was known as Begaljevo, and the current form of the name may be a crossing with the name Bugarica, which the village also was known as in Ottoman times. Under Austrian administration (1718–1739) it was known as Bigaliza.

== Geography ==
Begaljica is located in the central part of Grocka, in the geographical regions of Podunavlje (Danube river basin), and Šumadija (central Serbia). It lies 107–270 m above sea level, on the water source sides of the Begaljica river, a right tributary of the Danube. Begaljica lies on both sides of the asphalt road towards Grocka, some 5 km southwest from the seat at Grocka. The cadastral area (atar) includes 3.171 hectares. Begaljica connects four physiographic "regions" – Nenadović, Brđani, Velemir and Manastir, and Cigan-mala.

The Begaljica Hill (Begaljičko brdo) is located west of Begaljica, with one of the steepest sections of the Belgrade-Niš highway.

=== 1903 ===
The village is located at the water source of the Begaljica river. The houses are located in the valley sides and flat areas nearer the river, while a large part is located on the hill as well. The highest elevations are at Gornji Kraj and Brđani. The atar (cadastral area) is large, while half of it is located in Šumadija, south of the Belgrade boundaries. The village is of the scattered type (sela razbijenog tipa), divided into the following parts: Gornji Kraj, Brđani, Topciski Kraj, Tašin Kraj, Prnjavor, Nestorovića, Radosavljevića, and Palalića Kraj. The central part is not divided into parts. Prnjavor (also known as Šatorište) is located by the Rajinovica Monastery. There is a total of 200 houses, and they are located equally distanced from each other in all parts.

In the locality of Karaula, there is a selište (deserted village). The locals said that Begaljica was once deserted, and empty for 70 years. Later, when the village was re-populated, the settlement (seat) was firstly in Milošev Potok (located in the north of the village), and then it was moved to Karaula (towards the Vrčin village), and from there in times of fleeing, the population then moved to the present settlement seat, while Karaula remained a selište.

== History ==
=== Prehistory and Roman era ===
The Vinča-Belo Brdo archaeological site is located nearby in Vinča, and dates to 5700 BCE; the Starčevo culture and Vinča culture covered most of the Balkans. Archaeological findings dating to the Bronze Age and Roman period has been found in the cadastral area. A complex of Roman sites in and around Grocka have been identified with AD SEXTUM MILIAREM. A 3rd century AD marble statue from the Severan era was discovered in Begaljica (see Belgrade City Museum link). Other findings include Roman silver coins of Trajan and Philip the Arab.

=== Modern history ===
After the fall of Belgrade on August 28, 1521, the Ottoman Empire under Sultan Suleiman occupied Belgrade and its surroundings. Central Serbia was incorporated into the Sanjak of Smederevo, then part of the Budin Eyalet. Begaljica (as Begaljevo) is first mentioned in an Ottoman defter dating to 1528, which registered a village with 5 households (families) and the Monastery of St. Rajko (Rajinovac) on the hill above the village. The 1530 defter registered 14 households. The 1536 defter registered 17 households, and apart from Rajinovac also the Monastery of St. Todor. The 1560 defter registered Rajinovac and a Monastery of St. Peter. Nothing is known about the monastery in the vicinity of Begaljica. Belgrade and its surroundings were under constant threat due to the Ottoman–Habsburg wars.

In 1688, during the Great Turkish War, the Habsburg troops took control over most of present-day Serbia after numerous battles and successfully besieging Belgrade, with the massive help of Serbs, but when the King redirected all forces to the Nine Years' War, the Ottomans closed in and took the city in 1690, ending the Habsburg conquests. Fear of Ottoman retaliation started the Great Serb Migrations from south of the Danube deeper into Habsburg territory. In 1717 the Austrians took the city again, and Belgrade and its surroundings became the Kingdom of Serbia, 1718–1739, and the villages around Belgrade were deserted and therefore temporarily settled with families from Worms and Styria, including Begaljica, which under Austrian administration was called Bigaliza. In 1732, Begaljica was part of the Orthodox parish of Rajinovac, and had 20 houses. Archimandrite Spiridon Vitković is mentioned as the prior of Rakovica and Rajinovac monasteries, possibly due to Rajinovac being deserted at the time, so it was put in joint administration. Serbian volunteers in the Austrian army liberated central Serbia in 1788, and the second Kingdom of Serbia was established. By 1791 however the Austrians were forced into withdrawal across the Danube and Sava rivers, joined by thousands of Serbian families who feared Ottoman revenge for supporting the Habsburgs.

During the First Serbian Uprising (1804-1813), Begaljica was part of the Grocka nahija which was headed prior to the uprising by obor-knez Stevan Andrejić-Palalija, murdered in the Slaughter of the Knezes (1804). Palalija was buried in Rajinovac. The village is mentioned in Serbian epic poetry regarding the Uprising against the Dahije. The suppression of the first uprising led to Ottoman retaliation, including in the Grocka region, which halted its development, and only after the Second Serbian Uprising (1815) and stability of the political situation in Serbia, the Grocka region started to intensively develop. In haraç (tax) registries, Begaljica had 51 houses in 1818, and 52 houses in 1822. Joakim Vujić crossed by the village in 1827, and registered the three villages of the Rajinovac Orthodox parish: Begaljica, Kamendol and Umčari as having 89 houses and 1212 people.

In 1845, the village community wanted to move the school from the Rajinovac monastery to the village itself, and in 1846 there was a school in the village. In 1846, it is mentioned as "a village in the Belgrade surroundings, in the Podunavlje srez", with 81 houses and 544 people. The school was located in a little house from 1871 to 1904, then a new school was built (mentioned in 1921).

On August 22, 2010, new Serbian Patriarch Irinej served in Rajinovac for the feast day of Saint Matthias the Apostle and Saint Anthony the Martyr.

== Economy ==
Begaljica is classified as a rural settlement (village) based on agriculture, namely fruits and viticulture, with 38,6% of the population being agrarian (1991). Industrialism was not widely caught up in Ritopek, Slanci, Višnjica, Vinča, Veliko Selo, Zaklopača, and Begaljica, as these were intensively working with silviculture of fruits and vegetables (1962). Begaljica is mostly known for its strawberries,

The Industrial Machinery "Elkom primat" is located in the village.

== Culture ==
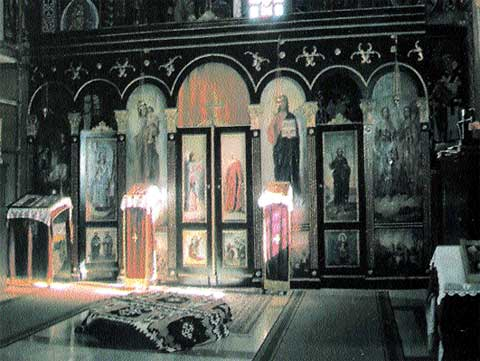
iconostasis in Rajinovac.

- Rajinovac, Serbian Orthodox monastery dedicated to the Virgin birth of Jesus, located on a hill above Begaljica, mentioned for the first time in 1528. It was rebuilt by oborknez Stevan Andrejević Palalija. It was added to the Monuments of Culture of Great Importance-heritage list in 1981.
- "Zavičajni muzej Grocke", museum

== Anthropology ==
=== 1903 ===
Families with unknown origin, viewed of as natives:

- The oldest families (clans) in the village, viewed of as natives, whose area of origin is unknown, are the Antonijević, Cvejić, Maksimović, Obrenović, and Savković, who together had 100 houses, and all families had the slava (Serbian Orthodox patron saint feast day) of St. Michael the Archangel (21 November).

Families with known origin (the rest):

- Bisenić (11 houses), old settlers from Kablar, slava of St. John.
- Polić (5 houses), from Prijepolje, a great-grandfather married into the Bisenić.
- Palalić, they descend from 4 brothers who worked the land, but their area of origin is unknown. They derived their name from one of these brothers who was called "Palalija" by the Turks. Slava of St. Nicholas. Stevan Andrejević Palalija (1804), known from Serbian epic poetry about the dahija, was part of the family.
- Nestorović, from the "Serb frontiers", slava of Demetrius of Thessaloniki (Mitrovdan).
- Bugarčić, from Pirot, slava of Presentation of Mary (Vavedenje).
- Karamihajlović, the great-grandfather Kara Mihajlo settled from Dučina (Kosmaj srez).
- Pirić and Milenković, one family (ca. 30 houses), from Pirot, slava of the Consecration of St. George (Đurđic).
- Maričić, from Lisović.
- Ljubisavljević, their ancestor Ljubosav came from Takovo and was a servant in the village.
- Martinović, their ancestor Martin, a Vlach, came from Transylvania.
- Gruičić, Stanković, Blagojević, Radojević families, came from Bjelopavlići after the Serbian-Turkish War (1878).
- Ignjatović, their ancestor came as a farm servant (argatin) from Kožinac near Tran in Bulgaria.

== Demographics ==
According to 2011 preliminary census, Begaljica had 8470 registered persons, with a population of 8233 (165 were abroad), and a total number of households of 2874 (4774 dwellings total).

=== Demographic history ===
pre-Yugoslav documents

- 1528 – 5 houses
- 1530 – 14 houses
- 1536 – 17 houses
- 1732 – 20 houses
- 1818 – 51 houses
- 1822 – 52 houses
- 1846 – 81 houses, 544 people
- 1903 – 200 houses

Censuses

- 1921 – 2,930
- 1948 – 3,175
- 1953 – 3,301
- 1971 – 3,604
- 1981 – 3,842
- 1991 – 3,328
- 2002 – 3,255 (96,68% of whom were Serbs)

== People ==
- Stevan Andrejić-Palalija (d. 1804), Serbian knez
- Milosav Jovanović (1935–2014), Serbian painter
