= Jevtović =

Jevtović (Serbian: Јевтовић) is a Serbian surname. It may refer to:

- Dušan Jevtović (1925–2011), painter
- Marko Jevtović (born 1987), tennis player
- Marko Jevtović (born 1993), footballer
- Milan Jevtović (born 1993), footballer
- Nikola Jevtović (born 1989), basketball player
- Zoran Jevtović (born 1958), footballer
