= Devići =

- Village
- Location within Serbia
- Coordinates: 43°25′25″N 20°22′45″E
- Country: Serbia
- District: Moravica District
- Municipality: Ivanjica

Area
  - Total: 0.79 km^{2} (0.31 sq mi)

Population (2002)
  - Total: 189
  - Density: 240/km^{2} (620/sq mi)
- Time zone: UTC+1 (CET)
  - Summer (DST): UTC+2 (CEST)

Devići is a village in the municipality of Ivanjica, Serbia. It is located in Moravica District. According to the 2002 census, the village had a population of 189 people.

== Landmarks ==
- House of Veniamin Marinkovic
