= Rajinovac =

Monastery in Serbia

Coordinates: 44.6247°N 20.7132°E

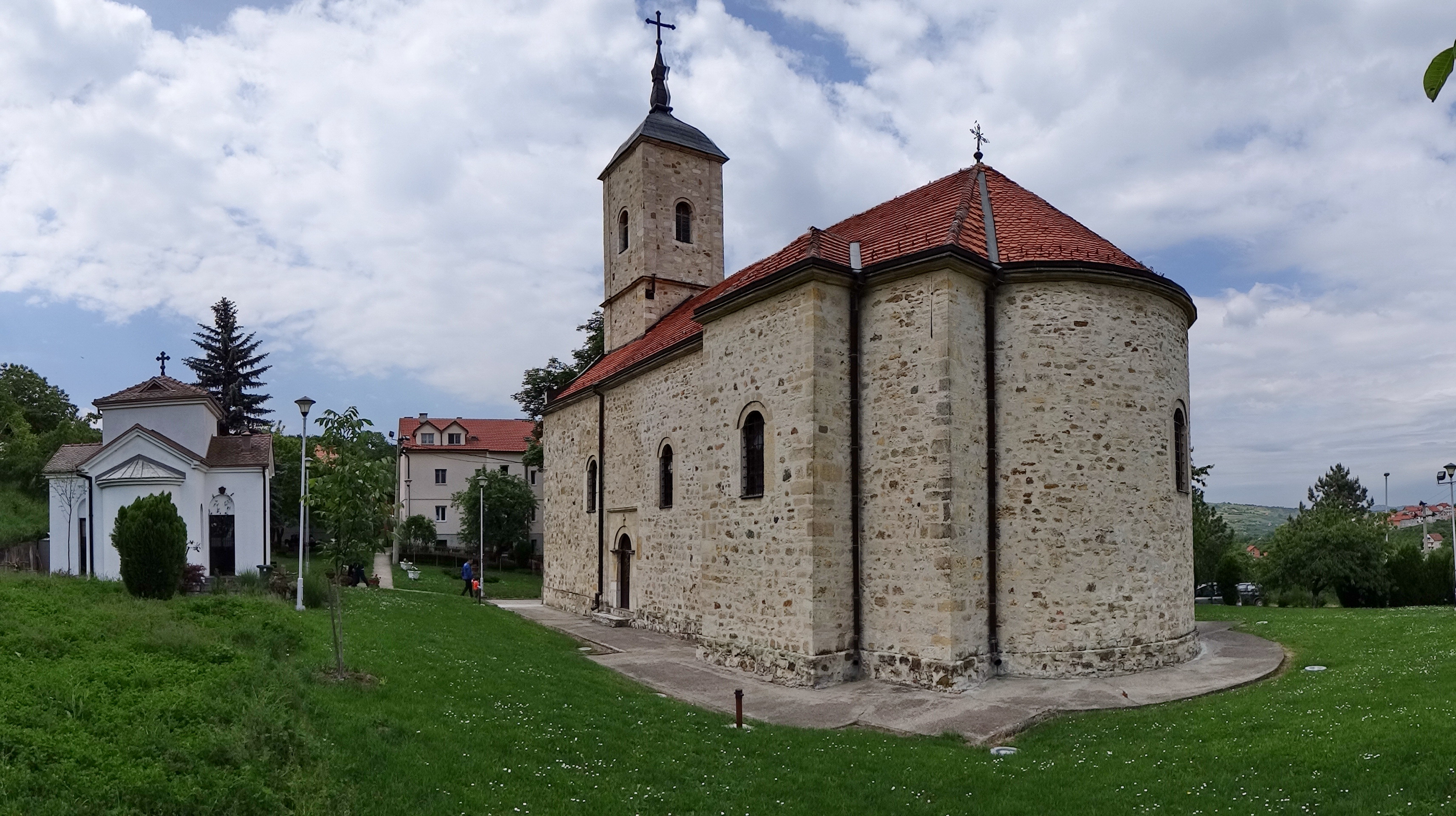
Rajinovac Monastery

Rajinovac Monastery is a Serbian Orthodox monastery located in the south end of Begaljica. While its date of founding is not known, it was first mentioned in the year 1528 in the Ottoman census of the Belgrade municipalities, listed as "Monastery of saint Rajko" - Manastir Svetog Rajka. The first major renovation of the monastery and church was completed by knez (Serb mayor) of Begaljica, Stevan Andrejić-Palalija in the year 1793. The church is dedicated to the Nativity of the Mother of God.

== See also ==
- List of Serbian Orthodox monasteries
