= Studenica =

Studenica may refer to:

- Studenica, Kosovo, in the Jezerska planina mountains, Kosovo
- Studenica (peak), north Macedonia
- Studenica (river), a tributary to the Ibar river in Serbia
- Studenica Monastery, a 12th-century Serbian Orthodox monastery in central Serbia
