= Milosav Jovanović =

Serbian painter (1935–2014)

- Милосав Јовановић
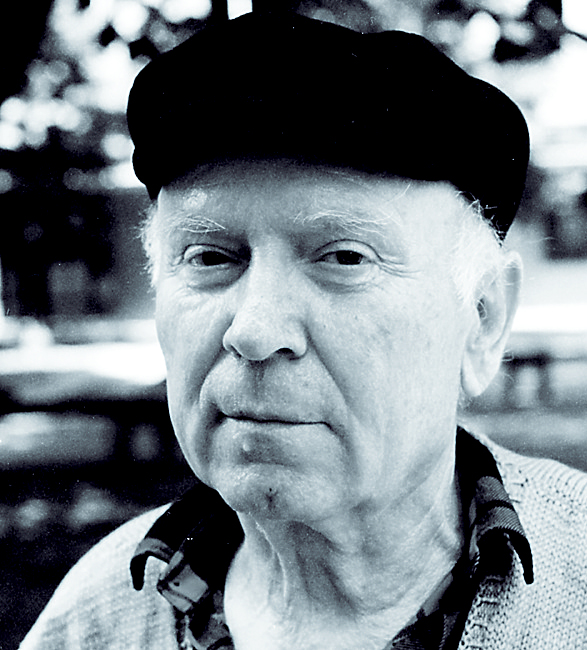
- Milosav Jovanović
- Born: Milosav Jovanović; May 3, 1935; Oparić, Jagodina
- Died: March 5, 2014 (aged 78); Begaljica, Belgrade
- Known for: Painter
- Movement: Outsider art, Naive art
- Website: http://www.mnmu.rs

Milosav Jovanović (Serbian: Милосав Јовановић; May 3, 1935 – March 5, 2014) is a Serbian Outsider art and naive art painter.

== Biography ==
Jovanović was born in Oparić, a village near Jagodina, Serbia, in 1935. He resided in Begaljica, a village near Belgrade, where he lived until his death, in 2014. He began painting in 1955. He is considered to be one of the foremost contributors to the naive art genre, and to the Serbian outsider art and naive art genres in former Yugoslavia and later on, in Serbia. Because of his original artistic expression and characteristic technique of painting, he attained a worldwide reputation.

== Artistic style ==
The focus of his interest was Eros and Tanathos. By painting landscapes the artist described the interior of his visions composed of suppressed fears, lost hopes and erotic phantasmagoria. The combination of spontaneous and instinctive presentation of the subject matter and its patient pictorial development is surprising. In his works of dense intensity in artistic expression and mystic messages, the inclination towards the decorative is combined with inner symbolical tension. The painter superficially distributed stylized shapes on the surface of the painting, avoiding empty areas and animating them using characteristic colour signs. These are short strokes in the shape of dots, blots, broken and parallel lines, circles or rhombus. The artist thereby intensifies the strength of experience by employing raw tint. His colour is not a coat but the texture. It brings pronounced energy and warmth, but reduces the predominance of the subject matter in its entire suggestiveness. The structure of forms which is especially interesting for the artist reveals his horror vacui therefore, he is persistently devoted to each segment of the coloured pigment, construing miniature cones over the flat surface. The encounters of red and greed reveal the passion of his chromatic expression, while his drawings, as a separate artistic branch, show even more inventive approach to the presentation of the vision itself. His drawing in Indian ink is a special quality within his oeuvre. The pronounced continuity, permeation, intertwining of vibrant graphic, filled and empty surfaces, i.e. black and white, optically contributes to the kinetics of pictorial elements. He had independent and group shows in the country and abroad.

== Exhibitions and awards ==
From 1960 Milosav Jovanović participated in significant international exhibitions and biennial and triennial events worldwide. From 1966, he exhibited at World Triennial in Bratislava. He received a series of recognition, including the Award for Entire Artistic Work at the Eleventh Biennial in MNMA, Jagodina, Serbia.

== Gallery ==
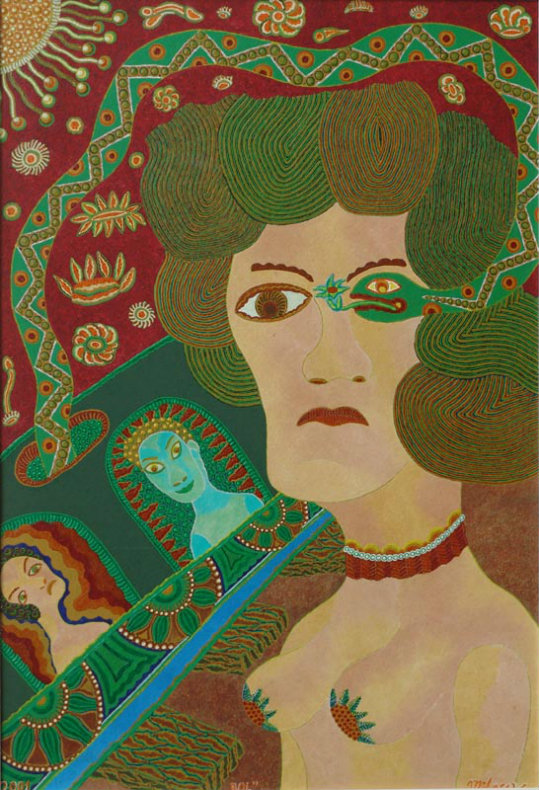
Pain, 2001
oil on cardboard, 51x35cm
MNMA, Jagodina

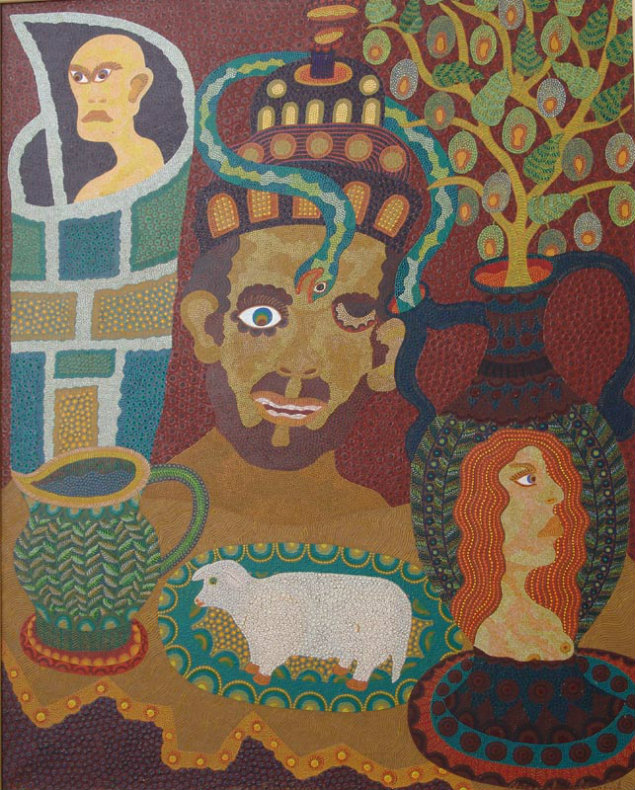
Short Biography, 1978
oil on canvas, 80x64cm
MNMA, Jagodina

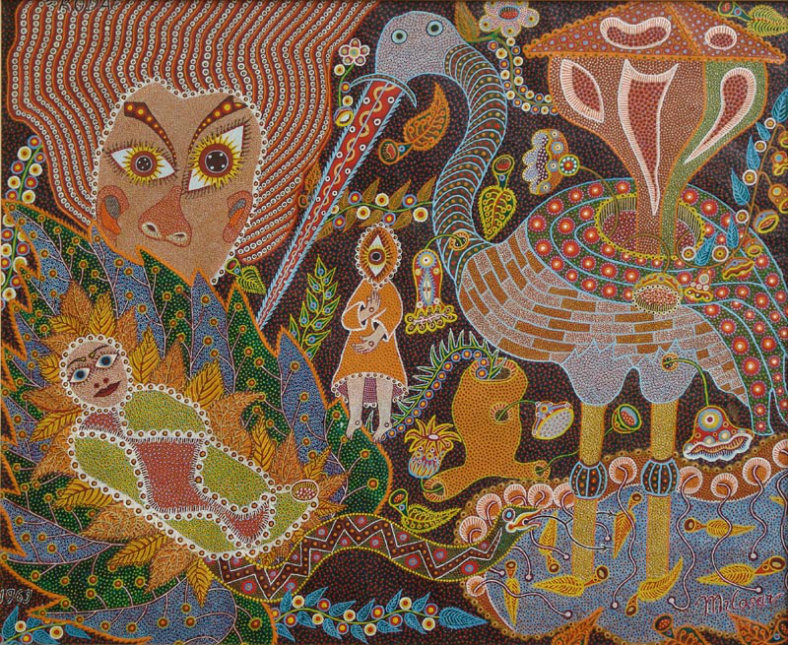
Stark, 1969
oil on canvas, 50x61cm
MNMA, Jagodina

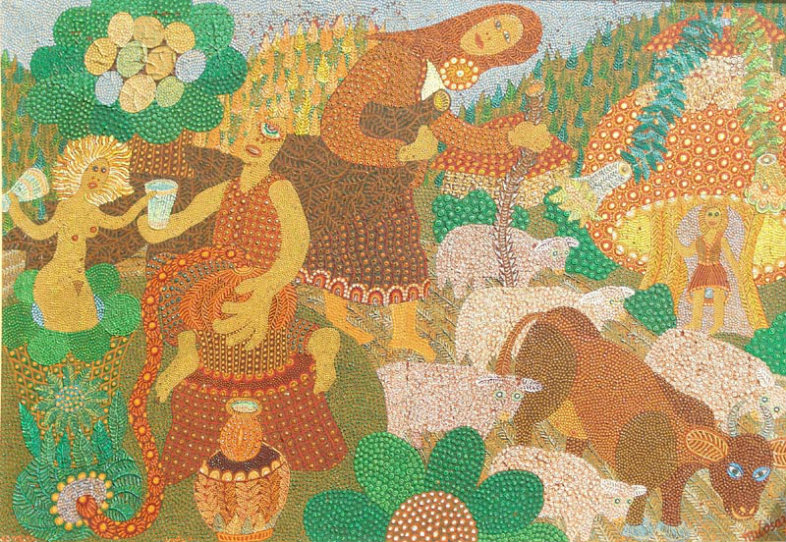
Evening, 1973-74
oil on canvas, 50x70cm
MNMA, Jagodina

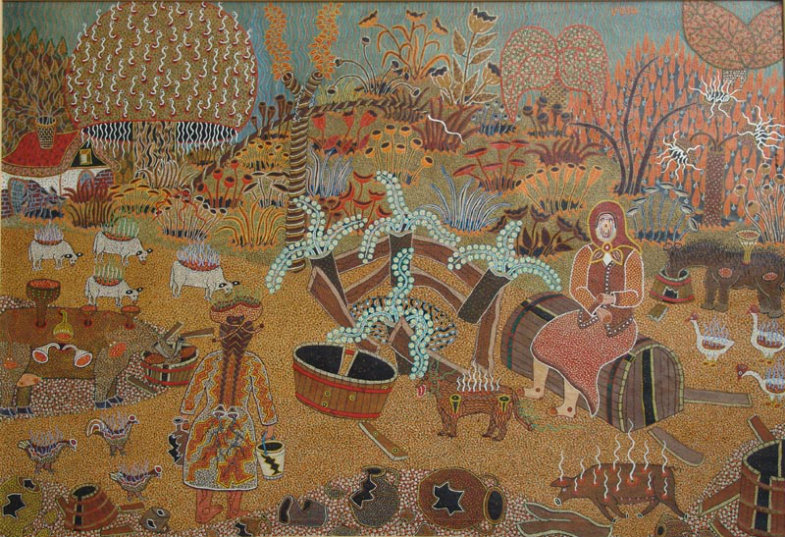
Water, 1966
oil on canvas, 67x97,5 cm
MNMA, Jagodina

== See also ==
- Dušan Jevtović

== Literature ==
- Oto Bihalji-Merin; Nebojša Bato Tomašević, Enciklopedija naivne umetnosti sveta, Beograd, 1984
- N. Krstić, Outsider Art in Serbia, monograph, MNMA, Jagodina, 2014, pp. 98–105
- М. Бошковић; М. Маширевић,Самоуки ликовни уметници у Србији, Торино, 1977
- N. Krstić, Naivna umetnost Srbije, SANU, Jagodina, 2003
- N. Krstić, Naivna i marginalna umetnost Srbije, MNMA, Jagodina, 2007
- N. Krstić, Outsiders, catalogue, MNMA, Jagodina, 2013
