= Studenica (river) =

Studenica (Студеница)
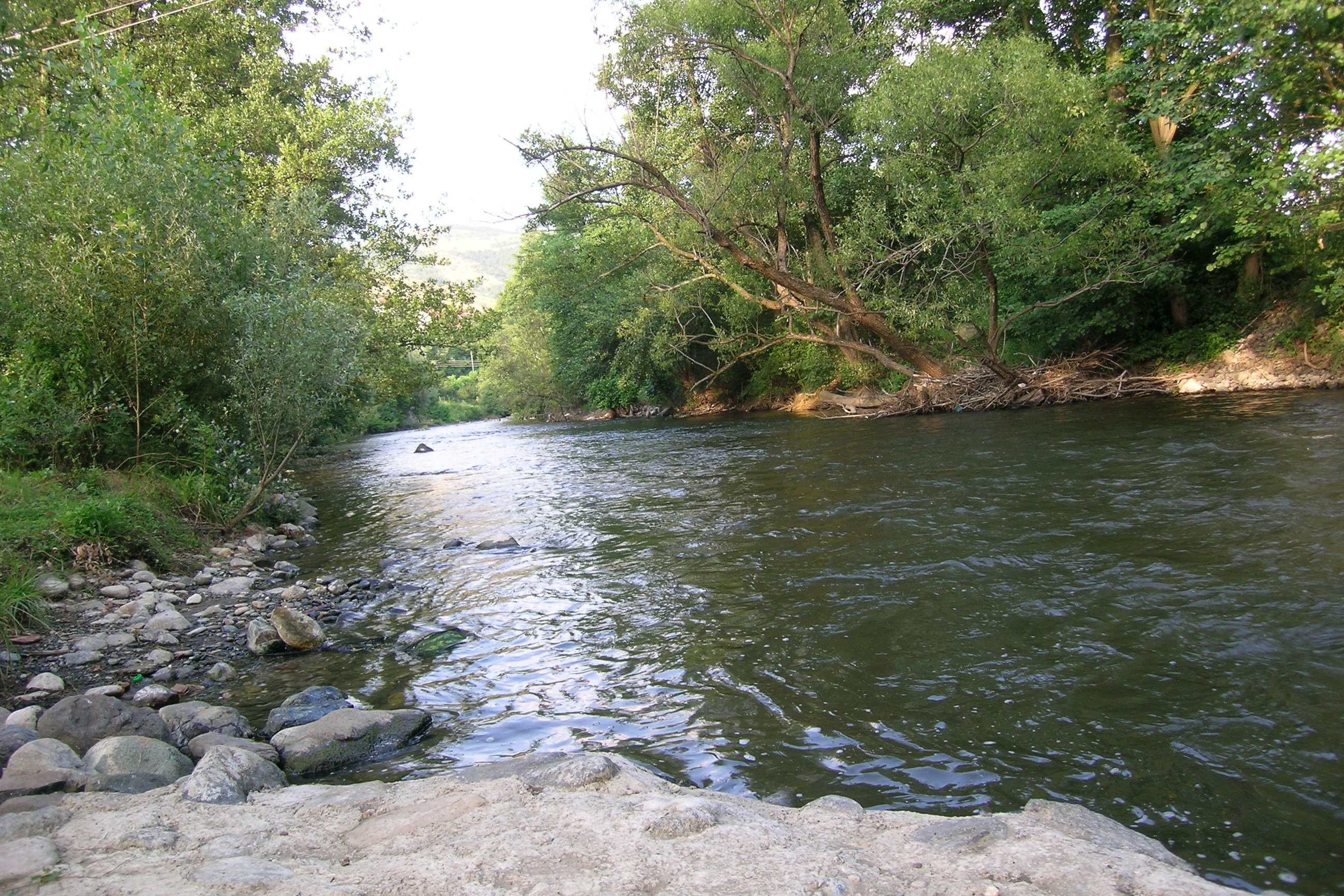
- Studenica river near Ušće

Location
- Country: Serbia

Physical characteristics
- Source
  - location: Golija mountain, Serbia (as the Crna reka)
  - elevation: 1,615 m (5,299 ft)
- Mouth
  - location: Ibar, at Ušće, Serbia
  - coordinates: 43°28′09″N 20°37′09″E
- Length: 60 km (37 mi)
- Basin size: 582 km^{2} (225 sq mi)

Basin features
- Progression: Ibar→ West Morava→ Great Morava→ Danube→ Black Sea

The Studenica (Serbian: Студеница, pronounced [studɛ̌nitsa]) is a river in southwestern Serbia, a 60 km-long left tributary to the Ibar river.

== Origin ==
The Studenica originates from the central section of the northern slopes of the Golija mountain, as the Crna reka (Crna River, "Black River"), at an altitude of 1,615 m. The river flows northward, parallel to the flow of the Brusnička reka (Brusnička River, "Brusnik River"), next to the villages of Crna Reka, Koritnik, Ratari and Pločnik. Between the villages of Devič and Čečina, the Crna Reka and Brusnička reka meet and continue to the north under the name of Studenica.

== Valley ==
The Studenica carved a long and deep gorge-like valley, characterized by the arc-shaped stretching in the west–east direction, between the Radočelo (on the south) and Čemerno (on the north) mountains. The villages of Usilje, Pridvorica, Mizdraci, Mlanča and Miliće are located in the valley, so as the Isposnica Monastery and the cave on Čemerno mountain.

The Čemerno mountain was a game hunting area from the Medieval period, with Saint Sava writing about his father, Stefan Nemanja, hunting on the mountain, and deciding to build Studenica Monastery there. The main game species was European deer, but due to the overhunting, both legal and illegal, the last deer was killed in 1962. In the late 2020, 33 stags and hinds were reintroduced in an 5.2 ha (13 acres) asylum. A year later further 30 animals were released, and by June 2023 there were over 100 deer spreading along the mountain's localities Ponore and Savovo. The reintroduction program was finished in July 2023 with addition of further 11 animals. The hunting will be allowed when the number of deer crosses 200 animals.

The most important feature in the entire Studenica valley is the Studenica Monastery, one of the oldest, largest and most famous of all Serbian Orthodox Church monasteries (UNESCO inscribed Studenica Monastery on the List of World Heritage Sites in 1986). Monastery is located near the village of the same name and after the village of Kosurići, the Studenica curves to the north emptying into the Ibar at the small town of Ušće.

The Studenica belongs to the Black Sea drainage basin, drains an area of 582 km^{2} itself, and it is not navigable.

The name of the river, Studenica, in Serbian means cold water.

== Controversy ==
In the valley, the river has a huge hydro electrical potential, but none is used so far. In the late 1980s and early 1990s government strongly pushed a project of damming the river and building a powerful hydro electrical power plant with the artificial lake. After the public outcry and protests from the Serbian Orthodox Church that the artificial lake would damage the monastery the idea was finally dropped.

In the late 2010s, construction of micro hydros in river's watershed began, so as on streams all over Serbia. Draining of the streams instigated protests and ecological, anti-micro hydro movements as people organized in various groups to protect the rivers. Two micro hydros were built on Studenica's tributaries, "Brevina" and "Dubočica". During the large floods in June 2020, Dubočica river damaged the plant washing away the road and the bank where the pipes were laid, breaking the entire pipe system, while "Brevina" clogged the tidal wave and debris, diverting the water and damaging the bridge. Both dams are named as damaging for the environment. "Brevina" is located in the Golija-Studenica Biosphere Reserve, the first UNESCO-MAB registered biosphere reserve in Serbia. The river itself was completely rerouted and the natural riverbed was narrowed and left empty. "Dubočica" is also known for the arrests because of the corruption during its construction.

== See also ==
- Rivers in Serbia
