= Tolišnica =

Coordinates: 43°37′N 20°25′E

Tolišnica Толишница (Serbian)
- Village (Selo)
- Interactive map of Tolišnica
- Country: Serbia
- District: Raška District
- Municipality: Kraljevo
- Time zone: UTC+1 (CET)
  - Summer (DST): UTC+2 (CEST)

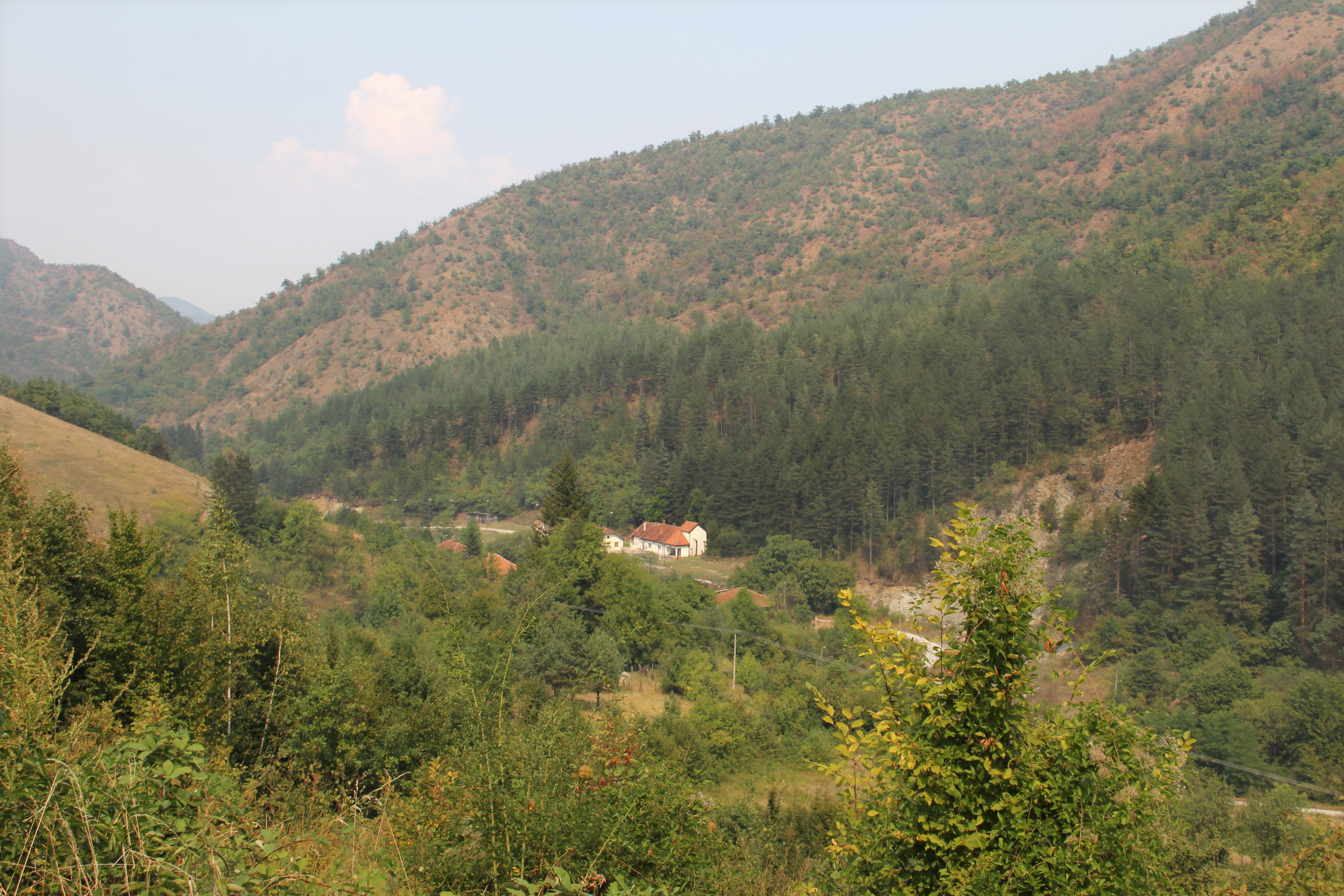

Tolišnica is a village situated in Kraljevo municipality in Serbia.
