= Kablar =

Kablar may refer to:

- Kablar (mountain), a mountain in central Serbia near Čačak
- Kablar (company), a cooperative agronomy company based in Gornji Milanovac, Serbia
- Kablar, Karlovac, a section of the city of Karlovac, Croatia
- Kablar, Ripanj, a section of Ripanj, a settlement in the city of Belgrade, Serbia
