= Palalić =

Palalić (Serbian: Палалић) is a Serbian surname. It may refer to:

- Jovan Palalić (born 1971), Serbian politician
- Gojko Palalić (born 1988), Serbian politician
