= Golija (Serbia) =

Mountain in Serbia

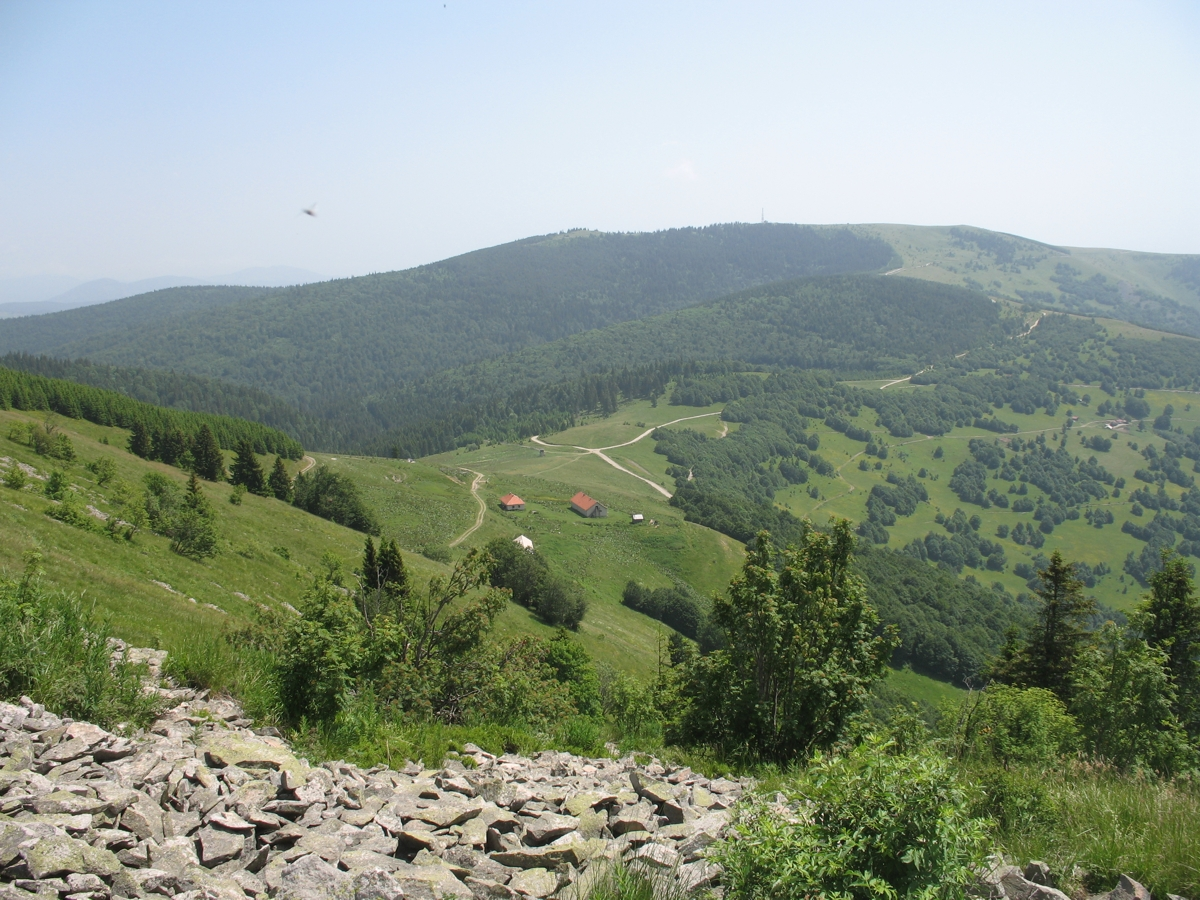

Highest point
- Elevation: 1,833 m (6,014 ft)
- Coordinates: 43°20′16″N 20°16′36″E

Geography
- Location within Serbia
- Location: Southwestern Serbia
- Parent range: Dinaric Alps

Golija (Serbian Cyrillic: Голија, pronounced [ɡǒlija]) is a mountain in southwestern Serbia. The mountain is heavily forested with significant biodiversity. It contains the Golija-Studenica biosphere reserve, the first biosphere reserve in Serbia. It is also a small ski resort, with several historical monuments and monasteries. The highest peak is Jankov Kamen at 1,833 metres (6,014 ft).

== Geography ==
Golija stretches for 32 km (20 mi) in north–south-north direction, in a C-shape. The mountain is located between Ivanjica on the north, and Novi Pazar and Raška on southeast. It covers an area of about 750 square kilometres (290 sq mi).

The highest peak is Jankov Kamen 1,833 metres (6,014 ft). It was named after Sibinjanin Janko, Serbian romanticized version of Hungarian medieval knight John Hunyadi. According to local myths, when he was returning to Hungary after the Second Battle of Kosovo in 1448. He placed a stone on top of the mountain to mark his presence, hence the name which is Serbian for "Janko's stone". The highest peak is followed by Radulovac (1,785 metres (5,856 ft)), Bojevo Brdo (1,748 metres (5,735 ft)) and Crni Vrh (1,725 metres (5,659 ft)). The peaks offer sightseeing to Golija's forests and pastures, as well as the peaks of nearby Kopaonik, Komovi and Prokletije mountains. On a clear day, even a distant mountains, like Durmitor in Montenegro or even Kosmaj, close to Belgrade, are visible.

There are over 250 water springs on Golija, and the Moravica and Studenica rivers have their headwaters at this mountain. Studenica breaches through the mountain, in its deep valley with several shorter gorges. The Izubra tributary has three waterfalls of total height of around 20 metres (66 ft), and several cascades.

There are four lakes on the mountain. At the altitude of 900 metres (3,000 ft) there are the Košanin Lakes, on the Crepuljnik's northern slopes. A natural phenomenon, where the water rescinds during the rain, and the water level rise in dry periods. There are two lakes, Great and Little Košanin Lake. They were named after biologist Nedeljko Košanin, who explored Golija in general. The Great Lake has only a small open surface area, as it is fully engulfed in bog vegetation. Small Lake is 90 metres (300 ft) long and partially salty. Third, Dajićko Lake, in time shrunk by half, though it has been protected since the late 1960s. It is also covered in algae and bog vegetation. Located on the northwestern slope of Golija, it is also locally known as Tičar Lake. Formerly encircled by the tall spruce forest which allowed sunlight only during the zenith, the forests thinned in time, which caused vegetation change both around and in the lake itself. Livestock grazing around the lake is forbidden. Numerous folk myths exist about the lake, which used to be a location of various folk rites. Myths include stories of the lake as a gathering spot of the most beautiful fairies and a popular story of the wedding party which drowned in the lake. The fourth lake, Nebeska Suza ("heaven's teardrop"), appeared after the 1977 Vrancea earthquake, and is the least explored. Though the youngest, it is the largest natural lake in the Moravica region.

Golija has three distinguishable climate areas, valley climate below 700 m altitude with moderate continental climate, transitional (700–1300 m) with short sharp winters and heavy snowfall, and the mountainous area (over 1300 m) with severe winters and short summer.

== Biodiversity ==
Nature park Golija-Studenica covers an area of 751.83 km^{2} (290.28 sq mi). Golija's plants account for 25 percent of Serbia's flora. There are recorded 1091 plant species in the park, including 117 types of algae, 40 species of mosses, 7 lichens and 75 species of fungi. Many of the species are relict and endemic. The Heldreich's maple is the symbol of the mountain, which constitutes deciduous and mixed-type forests, some of the best preserved in Serbia. There are also 225 medicinal herbs. Records show that Golija's herbs were used in 1207, in the first hospital in medieval Serbia, which was founded in the Studenica monastery.

Golija is one of important mountainous European ornithology reserves, with 95 registered bird species, including Eurasian sparrowhawk. The 22 mammal species include the rare and protected wolves, brown bears, least weasels, dormice, red squirrels, red foxes, wild boars and water shrew.

As the villages on the mountain are depopulating, the wildlife returns and blossoms. Expansion of the wild boars caused the potato, grains and corn production to cease almost completely. Bears appeared during the Bosnian War, in the first half of the 1990s. By the 2020s, they started to exhibit a shift in their behavior, not going into hibernation when they should. In these periods they break fruit trees (plum, apple and pear), destroy beehives, and enter the villages, breaking into the barns and killing sheep and pigs.

In September 2001, the UNESCO declared part of the Golija-Studenica nature park as the Serbia's first biosphere reserve. It covers 538.04 km^{2} (207.74 sq mi) within the nature park.

== History ==
The reserve contains Studenica Monastery. Built in 1196, it is a cultural World Heritage Site since 1986, and a popular tourist destination. Some 10 kilometres (6.2 mi) away are two hermitages, built by Saint Sava after his return from the Mount Athos in the 13th century. Known as the Upper and the Lower Sava's Hermitages, they are located on the steep cliff, several hundred meters above the Studenica river. The Gradac Monastery, finished in 1282, is also located on the mountain. The monasteries of Sopoćani, Stari Ras and Klisura Monastery lie at the outskirts of Golija.

The Golija area has a population of 6,600 within the 42 dispersed rural communities characteristic of these mountainous regions. The main economic activities are livestock raising, farming, and collection of forest products such as mushrooms and medicinal herbs. Main agricultural products are potatoes, raspberries and buckwheat. The area is known for the local cuisine, which includes buckwheat pie, sirene, kaymak, tubošak (curdled milk before all whey is removed), jurdum(salted thick sheep's milk) and trout dishes, from the fish caught in the local streams.

== Tourism ==
The mountain has several skiing facilities, with two hotels built on the mountain itself and several resorts in the vicinity of Ivanjica and Novi Pazar. There are hunting grounds in Čemernica, Grabovica, and Golija with roe deer, boar, and hare.

At the Daićko Lake, there is a memorial drinking fountain, dedicated to the forestry pioneer on Golija, Vlastimir Parezanović. It holds a carved inscription: "If every man would know which tree is his own, he would never cut it".

== Gallery ==
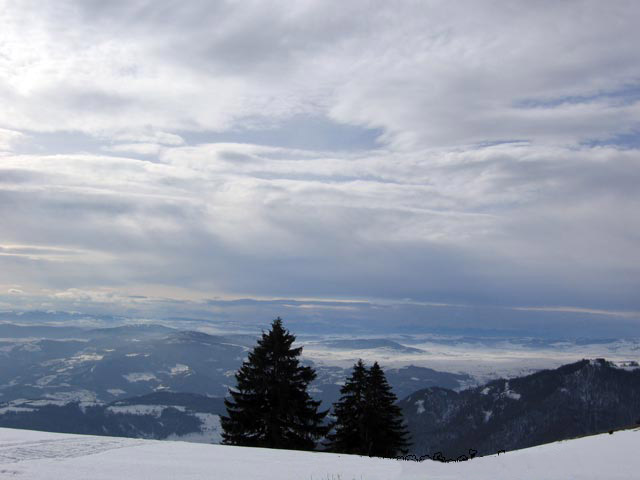

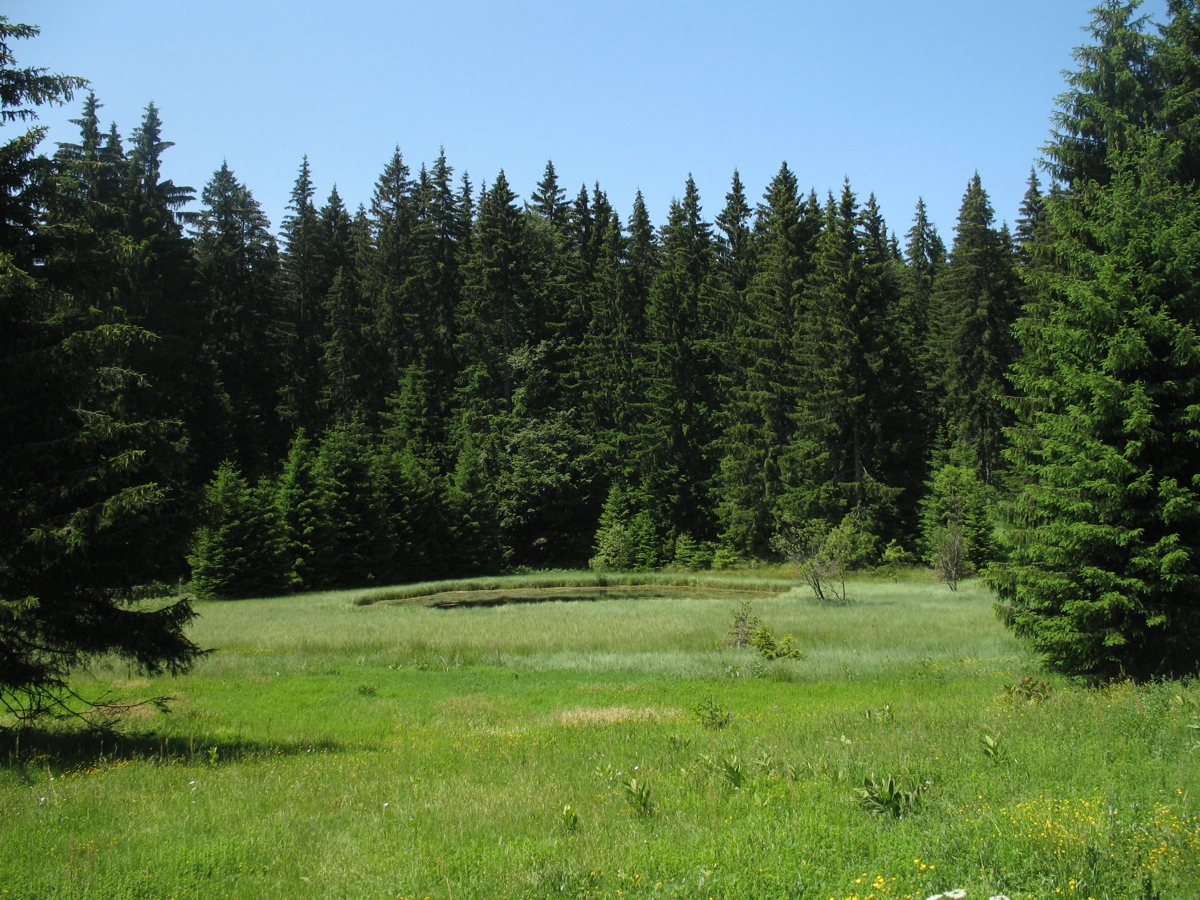

== See also ==
- List of mountains in Serbia
