= Dušan Jevtović =

Serbian naïve art painter (1925–2011)

Dušan Jevtović Душан Јевтовић
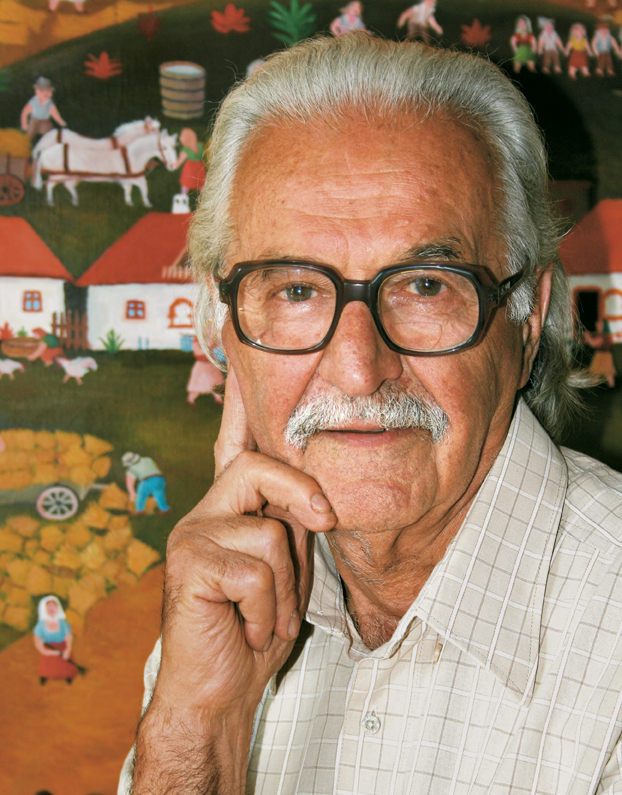
- Dušan Jevtović
- Born: Dušan Jevtović; August 9, 1925; Gornja Tranava, Prokuplje; Yugoslavia
- Died: October 6, 2011 (aged 86); Belgrade; Serbia
- Known for: Painter
- Movement: Naive art

Dušan Jevtović (Serbian Cyrillic: Душан Јевтовић); village Gornja Trnava nearby Prokuplje, August, 9th 1925 – Belgrade, October, 6th 2011), Serbian naive art painter. He is considered to be one of the foremost contributors to the naive art genre, with a worldwide reputation.

== Biography ==
Dušan Jevtović was born in Gornja Tranava, a village near Prokuplje in 1925. He began painting in 1956. He died in Belgrade in 2011.

== Artistic Style ==
National customs, church festivals, celebrations, natural disasters, misfortunes, human existence in general represented by interwoven friezes of people with exaggerated gestures, are all metaphors of collective consciousness, of total power of human multitude in good and evil. Horses, white, yellow, red rising on hind legs against the ruby-red sky and symbolizing life power, or a dragon representing the evil, all dwell in Jevtovic's rosy heaven like an eternal counterpoint: the fight between the real and imagined, good and bad… Dozens of portraits of human groups are connected by various incidents. The artist's sense of movement and crowd arrangement shows his innate feeling of composition. Gestures, clothes, and habits display features typical of the area and the people in ecstatic mood. The artist wishes to connect them with a ritual and therefore applies a pictorial structure resulting in perfect and imaginative observations. Thus, his paintings are raised from more description to the heights of distinctive painting formulae.

== Exhibitions and awards ==
Dušan Jevtović participated in representative exhibitions in the country and abroad, such as Salons and Biennials of Naïve art in Jagodina, Munich (1968), Rome and Tokyo (1971), Paris, Belgrade (2003), Sofia (2007), Budapest (2008), and in significant international exhibitions: Lugano (1969), Naivi (1979, 1973, 1977). He was awarded numerous recognition for his work, among which the most important are the Award for Entire Artistic Work (1987) and Grand Prix at the Ninth and Twelfth Biennial (1999, 2005) of Museum of Naïve and Marginal Art, Jagodina.

== Gallery ==
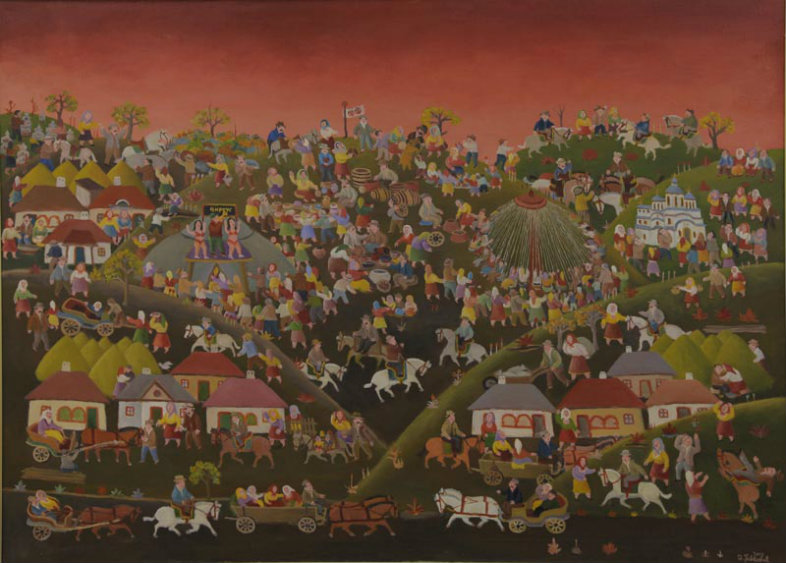
Village Patron Saint’s Day, 2009
acrylic on canvas, 95x130cm
MNMA, Jagodina

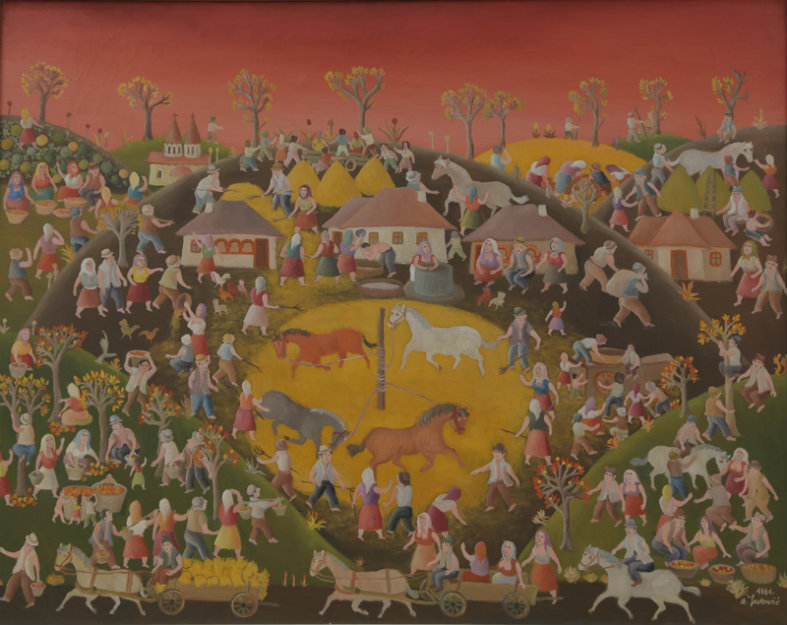
Summer in my Village, 1986
oil on canvas, 73x92cm
MNMA, Jagodina

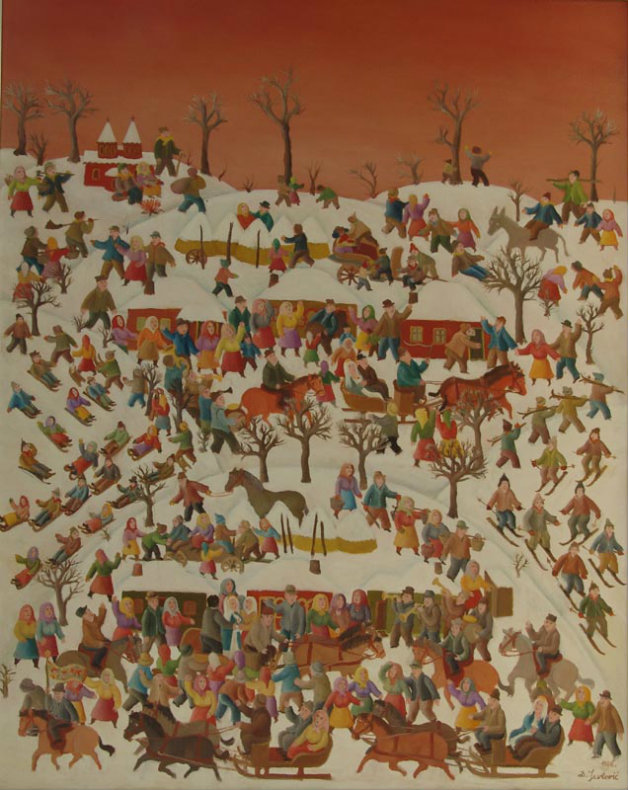
Winter Weddings, 1986
oil on canvas, 92x73cm
MNMA, Jagodina

== See also ==
- Milosav Jovanović

== Literature ==
- Oto Bihalji-Merin; Небојша Бато Томашевић, Енциклопедија наивне уметности света, Београд, 1984
- М. Бошковић; М. Маширевић,Самоуки ликовни уметници у Србији, Торино, 1977
- Н. Крстић, Наивна уметност Србије, САНУ, МНМУ, Јагодина, 2003
- N. Krstić, Naïve and Marginal Art in Serbia, MNMU, Jagodina, 2007
- N. Krstić, Život je slavlje, MNMU, Jagodina, 2012.
