= Savovo =

Savovo Савово (Serbian)
- Village (Selo)
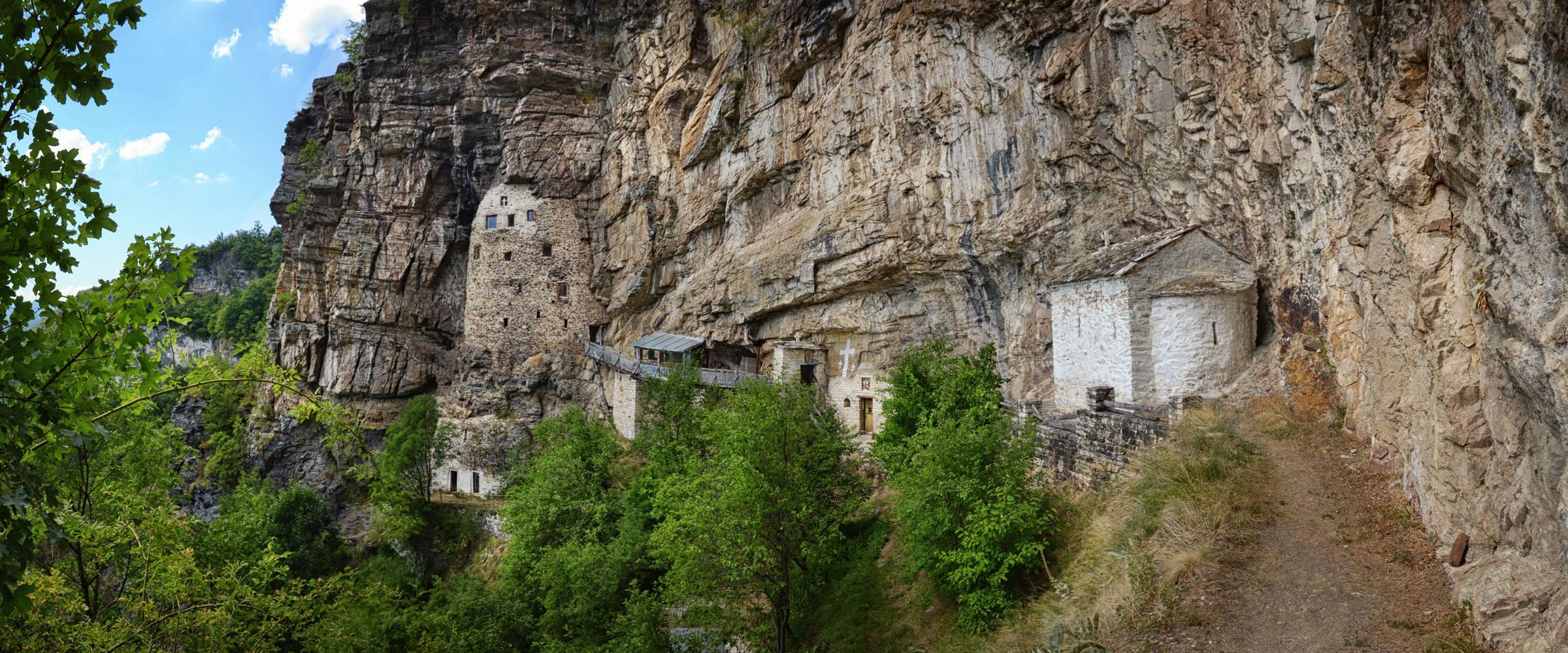

- Location within Serbia
- Coordinates: 43°32′29″N 20°28′01″E
- Country: Serbia
- District: Raška District
- Municipality: Kraljevo
- Time zone: UTC+1 (CET)
  - Summer (DST): UTC+2 (CEST)

Savovo is a village situated in Kraljevo municipality in Serbia.
