= Veliko Selo =

Veliko Selo may refer to the following places in Serbia

- Veliko Selo (Palilula), suburban settlement of Belgrade
- Veliko Selo (Loznica)
- Veliko Selo (Malo Crniće)
- Veliko Selo (Pirot)
