= Loznica =

Loznica Лозница (Serbian)
- City
- City of Loznica
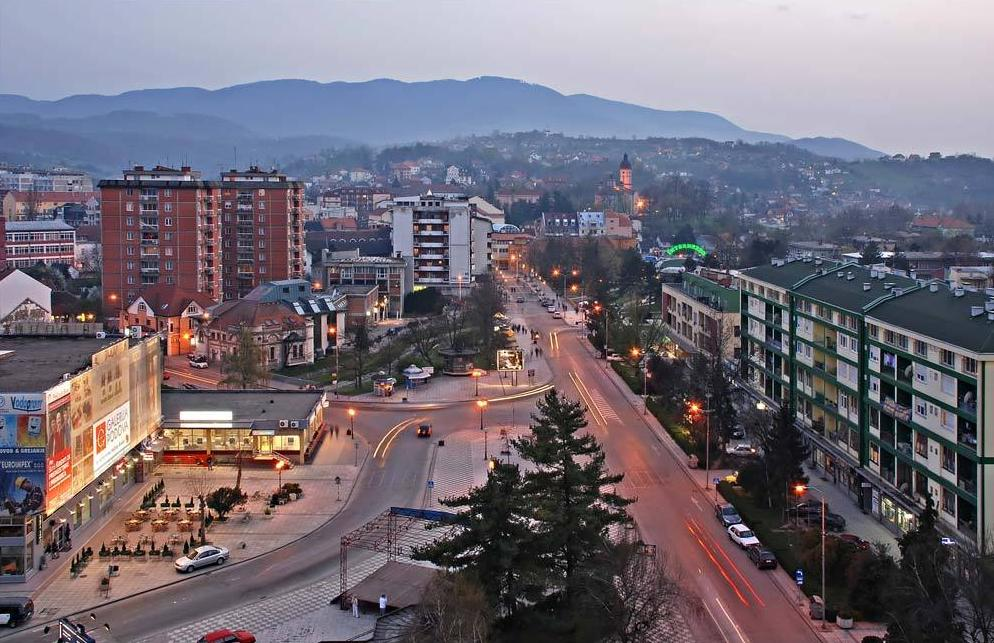
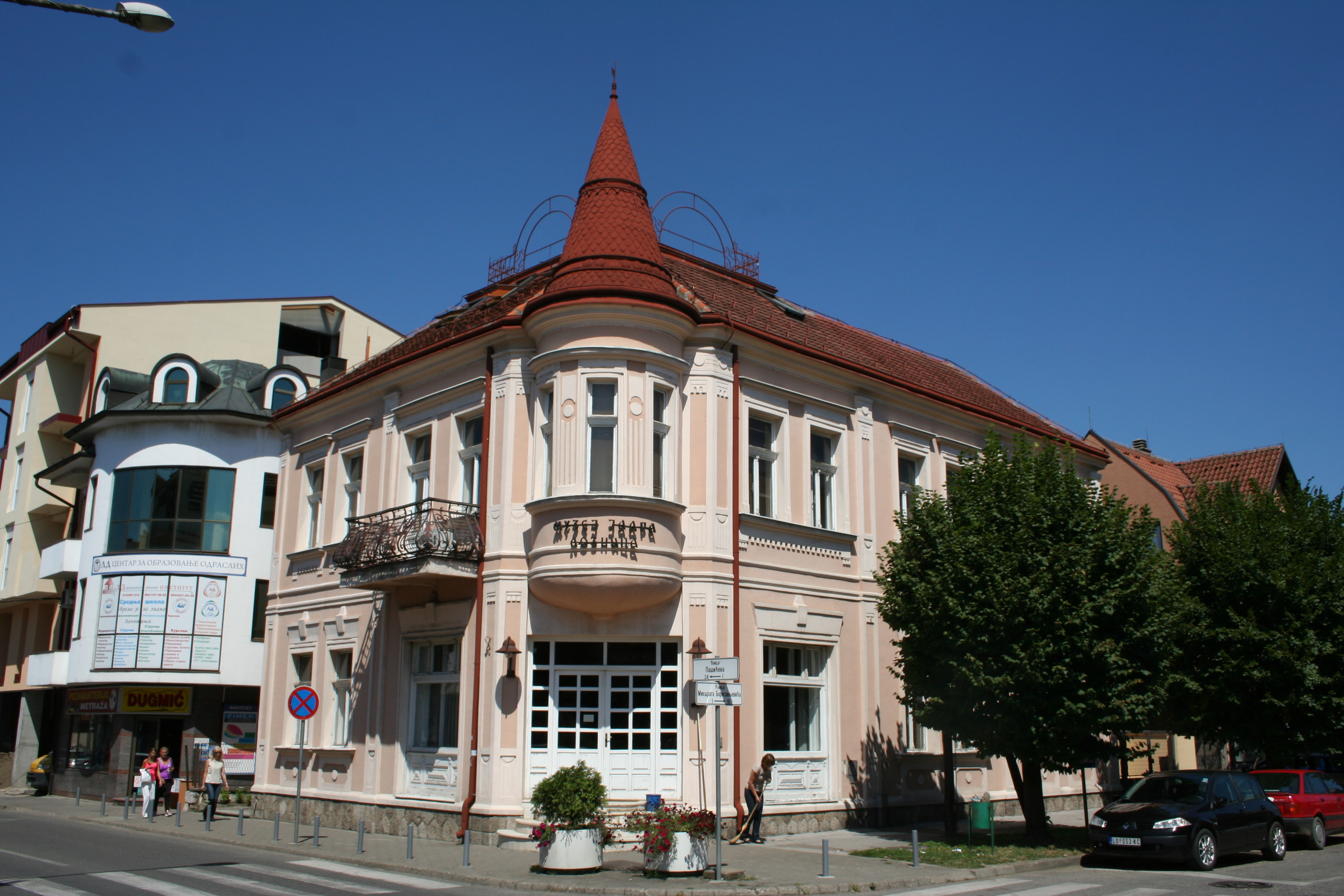
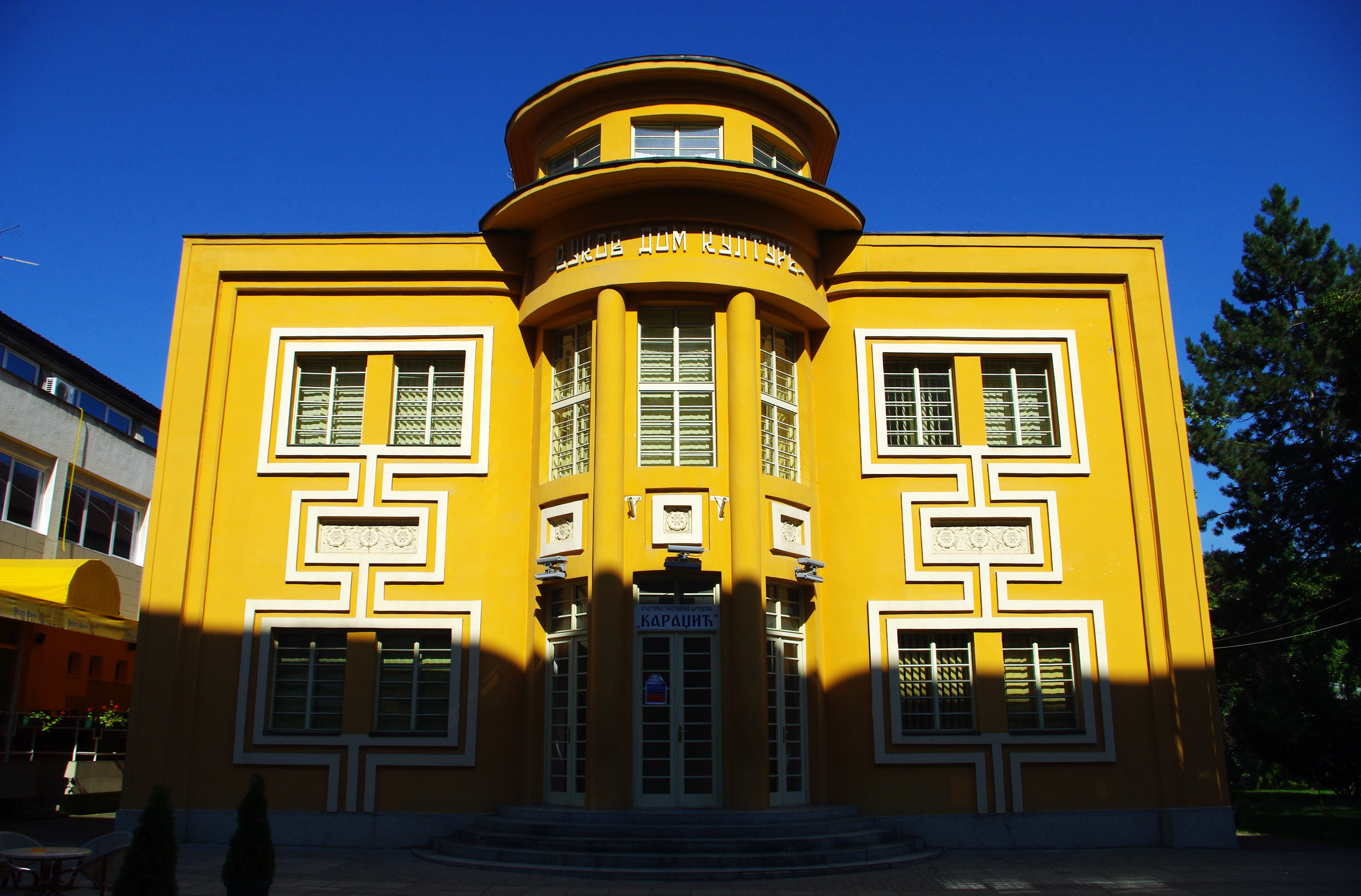
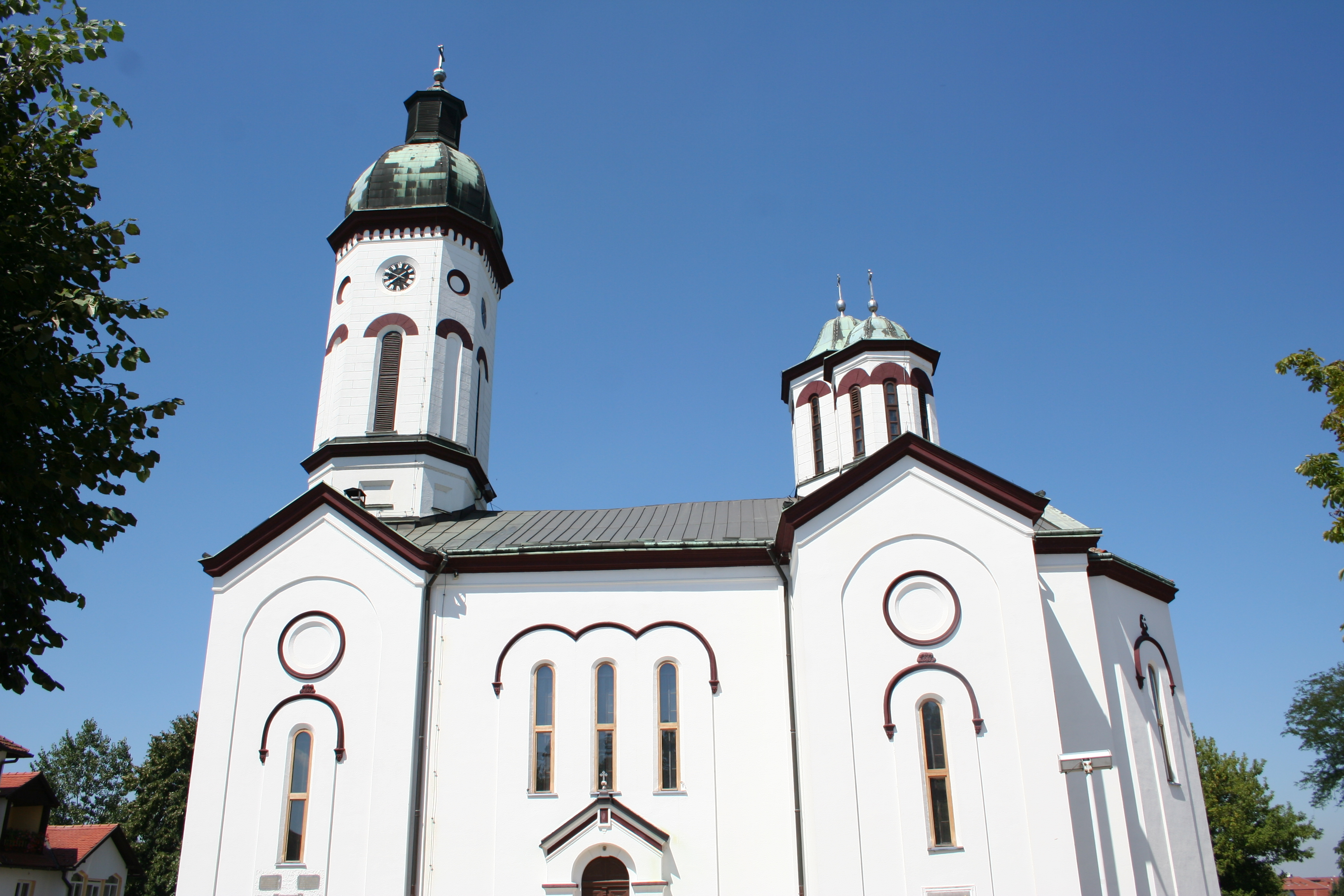
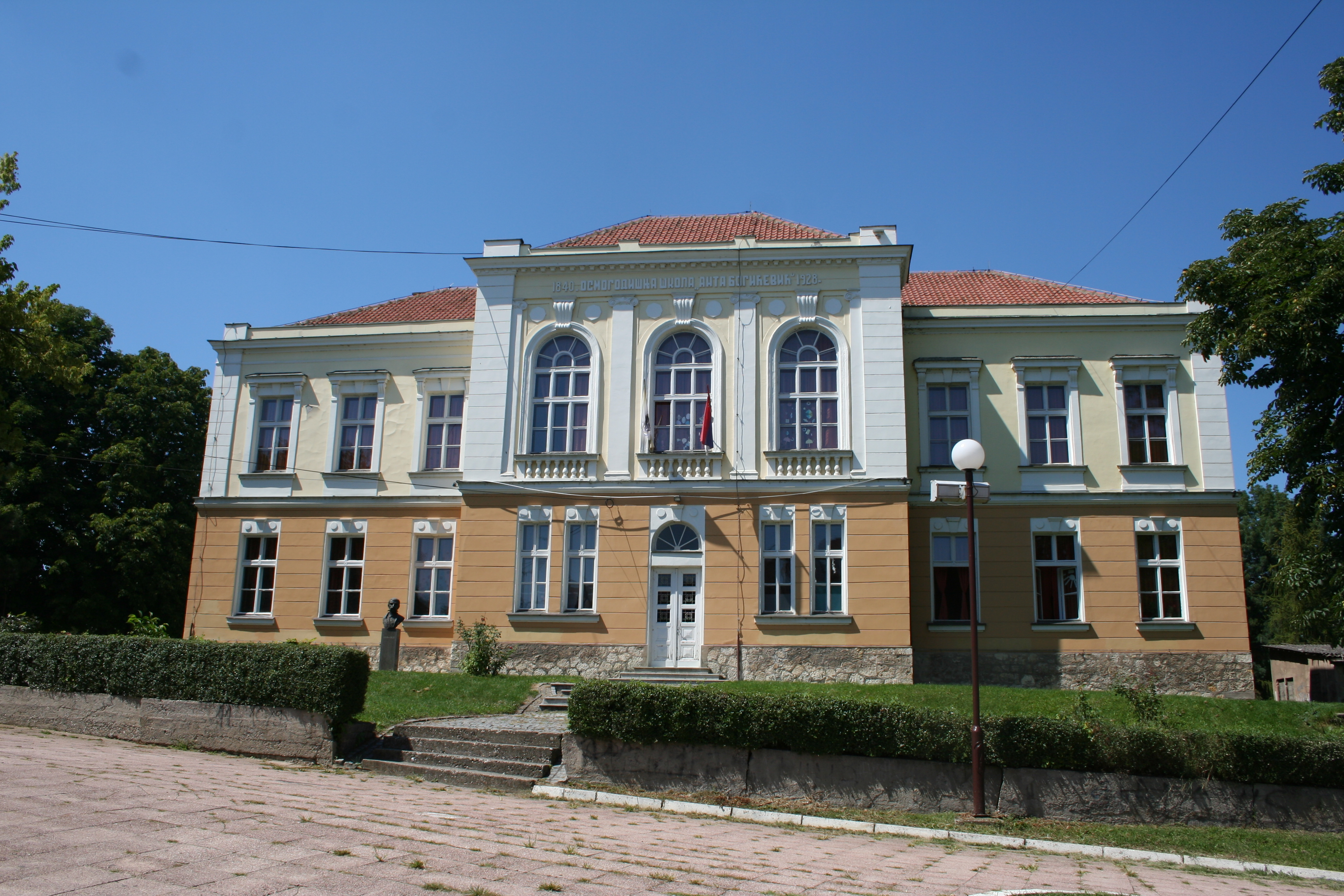
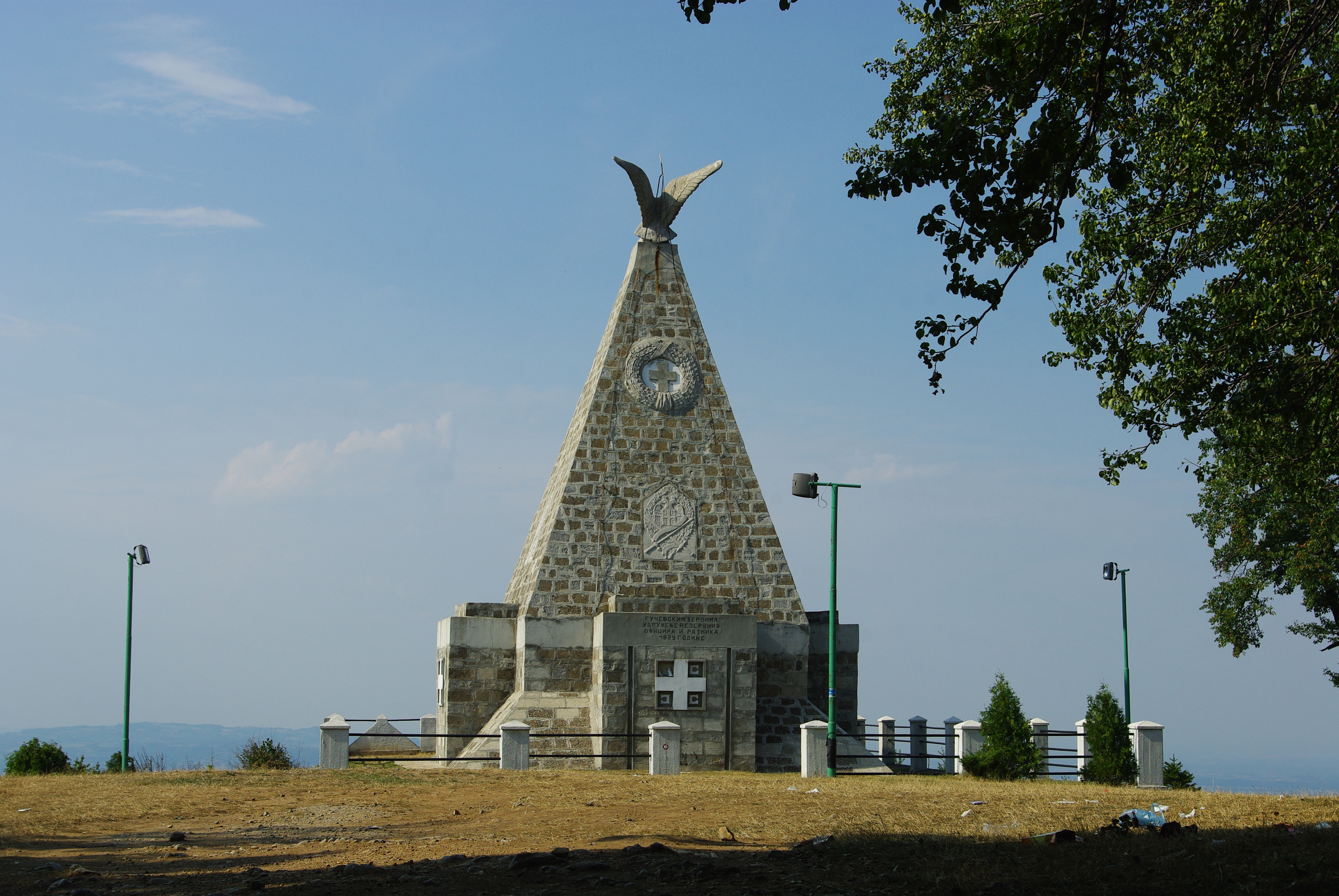
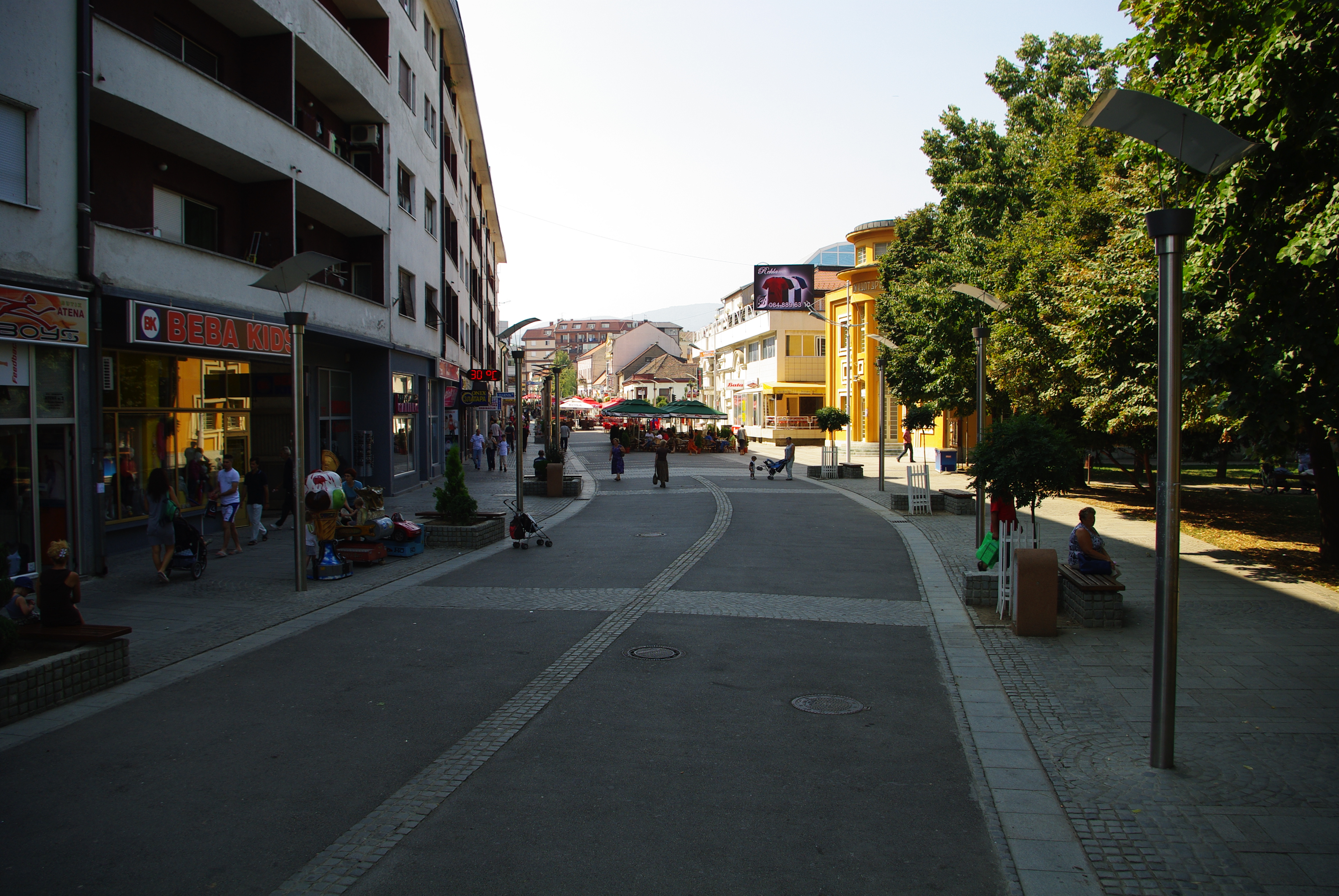
- Panorama of Loznica Loznica City Museum Vukov Dom Cultural Center Church of the Most Holy Mother of God Elementary school "Anta Bogićević" Battle of Drina monument on Gučevo mountain Corso in Loznica

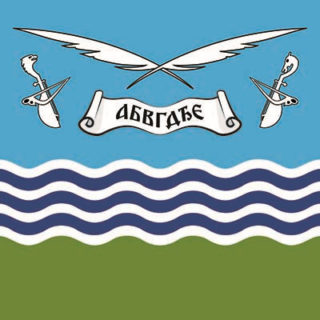
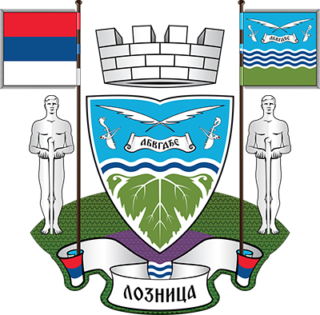
- Flag Coat of arms
- Etymology: Vine (sr. loza)
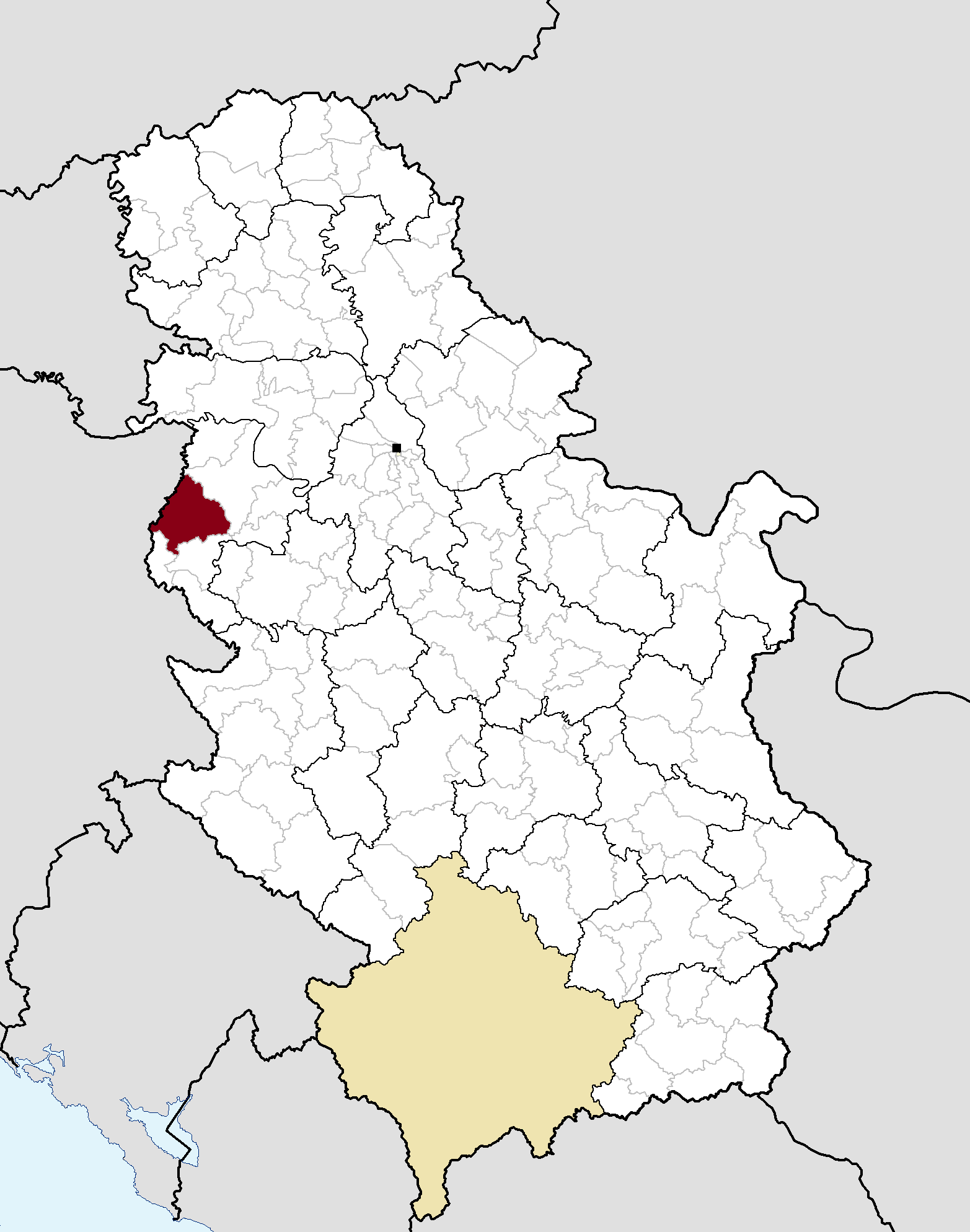
- Location of the city of Loznica within Serbia
- Interactive map of Loznica
- Coordinates: 44°32′00″N 19°13′33″E
- Country: Serbia
- Region: Šumadija and Western Serbia
- District: Mačva
- Settlements: 52

Government
  - Mayor: Dragana Lukić (SNS)

Area
  - Urban: 9.45 km^{2} (3.65 sq mi)
  - Administrative: 612 km^{2} (236 sq mi)
- Elevation: 121 m (397 ft)

Population (2022 census)
  - Rank: 18th in Serbia
  - Urban: 19,515
  - Urban density: 2,070/km^{2} (5,350/sq mi)
  - Administrative: 72,062
  - Administrative density: 118/km^{2} (305/sq mi)
- Time zone: UTC+1 (CET)
  - Summer (DST): UTC+2 (CEST)
- Postal code: 15300
- Area code: +381(0)15
- ISO 3166 code: SRB
- Car plates: LO
- Official languages: Serbian
- Website: www.loznica.rs

Loznica (Serbian Cyrillic: Лозница, pronounced [lǒznitsa]) is a city located in the Mačva District of western Serbia, on the right bank of the Drina river. In 2022 the city had a total population of 19,515, while the administrative area had a population of 72,062.

Its name stems from the word "loza" (the Serbian word for vine). Originally, its name was Lozica (Serbian for small vine), but it later became Loznica.

== History ==
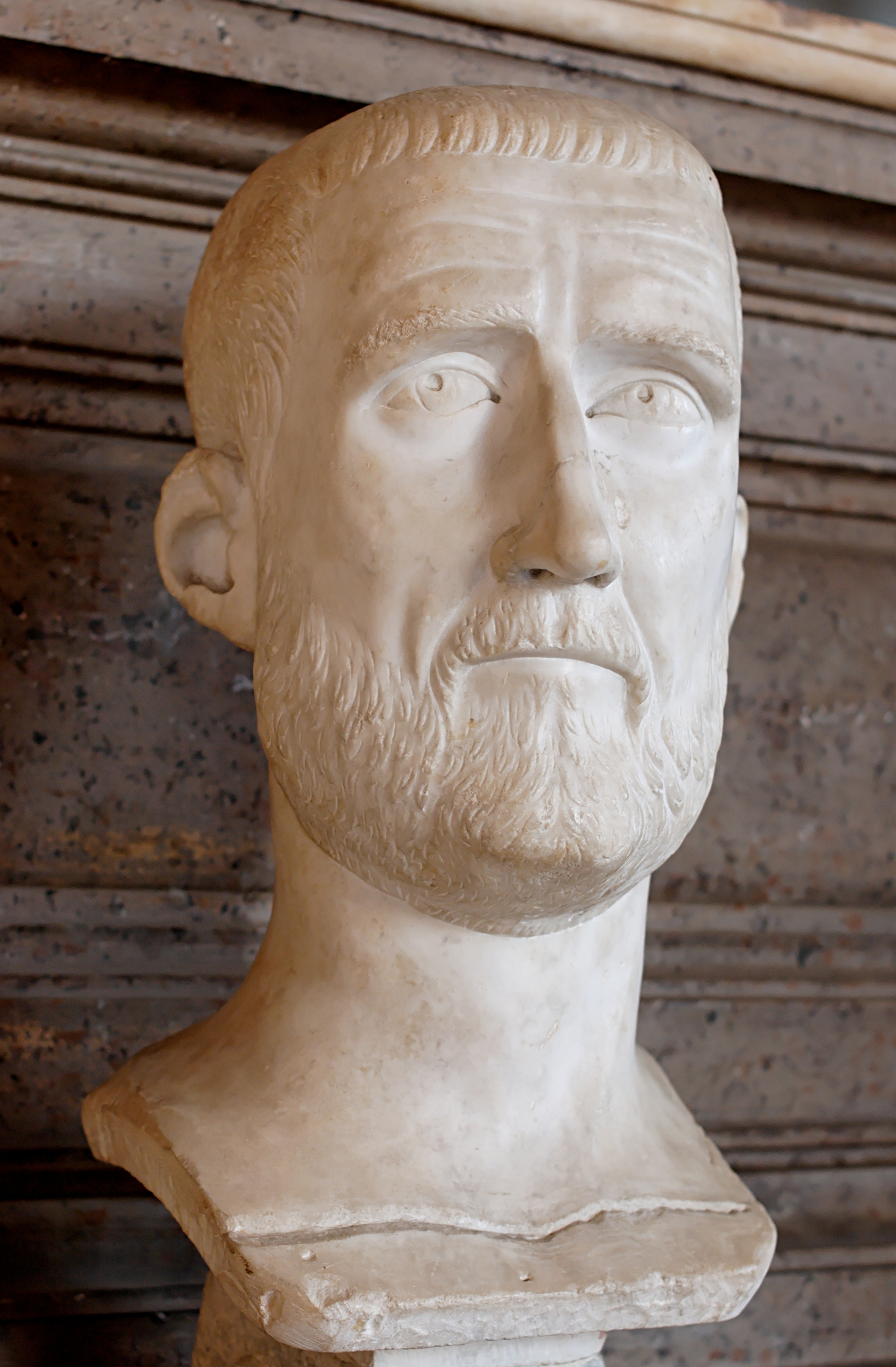
Marcus Aurelius Probus

The oldest settlements on the territory of Jadar and Loznica can be traced to the Neolithic period when the Starčevo culture flourished from 4500–3000 BC. Illyrian and Celtic tribes inhabited the region prior to the Roman conquest in 75 BC. Roman conquest of the Balkan Peninsula brought huge changes: the territory became part of the Roman province of Dalmatia.

The most important settlement in Jadar was Genzis, located near Lešnica, while the Roman settlement in present-day Loznica was called Ad Drinum. Legend tells that Loznica was named after the grape vines that were grown in this region, starting from the 3rd century AD in the time of Roman Emperor Probus. The first reference to the town as Loznica dates back to the reign of Serbian King Stefan Milutin, when Catherine, the wife of Milutin's brother Dragutin, founded the nearby monastery of Tronoša (1317). Loznica received little notice for the next two hundred years. By 1533, Loznica had been conquered from the Serbian Despotate by the Ottoman Empire and was then populated by Muslims; according to the tax registry, out of 37 houses, 26 houses were Muslim and 11 were Christian.

In 1600, Loznica became an officially Muslim (Bosniak) settlement with 55 houses. In this period Loznica and Jadar were part of the region administered from Zvornik. The Zvornik region itself was ruled by the pasha in Bosnia. Striving toward liberation from Ottoman rule, the population of Loznica was actively involved in the common fight of the Serbian people, beginning with the First Serbian Uprising of 1804. The uprising was important since the Ottomans did not easily give up on the border part of their territory from which they could harvest taxes and supply their army as well as break through towards the central part of the rebellious Serbia.

During the period of the First Uprising (1804–13), numerous and heavy battles against the Ottomans were fought in Loznica and its vicinity. In 1813 the Serbs managed to drive the Ottomans across the river Drina, at which time the Ottomans reoccupied Loznica. In November 1833, Loznica and Jadar officially became part of the Principality of Serbia, during the rule of Miloš Obrenović, when Sultan Mahmud II ceded six seized regions to Serbia. This resulted in the abolition of Ottoman ownership over the land and it was declared a free peasant state, which meant that the feudal system was revoked.

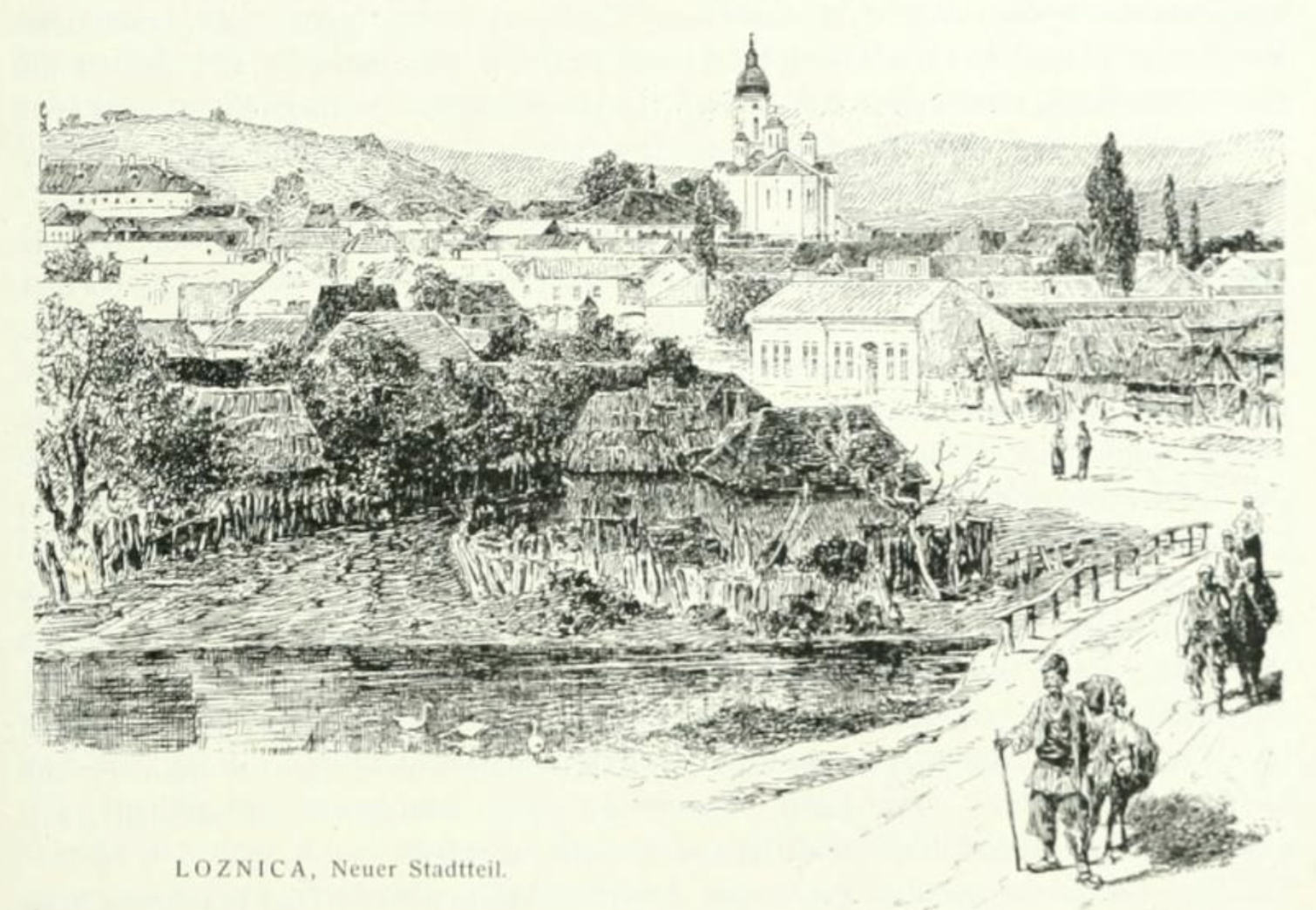
Loznica in the 1860s

Jadar became part of the Podrinje region, while Loznica became the seat of the region, remaining in this role until the end of the 19th century, when the capital was moved to Šabac. During the 1830s, Loznica had 295 houses with 1203 people and became the centre of the administrative and political power of Podrinje. The education system started to develop and a hospital was set up (1882), construction of industrial buildings started, craftsmen, trade and banking started to develop. Construction of the railway between Šabac, Loznica and Banja Koviljaca started by the beginning of the 20th century. The First Balkan War and First World War halted economic development and significantly reduced the number of people in Loznica and vicinity.

Upon completion of the First World War, Loznica remained a regional centre with about 5000 people. There was a short period of reconstruction and economic development, followed by the Great Depression, which saw a decline in the prices of agricultural products. By the mid-1930s, craft and trade shops had been established, bringing some relief to the economy. Later, the antimony mines were acquired by German industrialists which further strengthened the economy. This growth was, however, brought to an abrupt halt at the beginning of World War II. Loznica became the first city in Europe to be liberated from German occupation when Chetnik units entered on 31 August 1941.

In January 2008, according to the Serbian law, Loznica received the status of a city.

== Geography and climate ==
The city is located in western Serbia, in the Mačva District, near the border with Bosnia and Herzegovina. It lies on the river Štira, near its confluence into the Drina river.

=== Climate ===
Loznica has a humid subtropical climate with cold winters, often very cold due to the mountain winds of nearby mountains, and warm to hot summers. When hot air from Adriatic Sea starts going inland, to the north-east it rises over mountain barriers (Zlatar and Zlatibor), gaining jet effect and continuing fast to western parts of Serbia.

Climate data for Loznica (1991–2020, extremes 1961–2020)
Month	Jan	Feb	Mar	Apr	May	Jun	Jul	Aug	Sep	Oct	Nov	Dec	Year
Record high °C (°F)	21.6 (70.9)	25.6 (78.1)	30.2 (86.4)	32.0 (89.6)	36.0 (96.8)	37.3 (99.1)	42.3 (108.1)	41.0 (105.8)	39.0 (102.2)	31.7 (89.1)	29.1 (84.4)	26.4 (79.5)	42.3 (108.1)
Mean daily maximum °C (°F)	5.7 (42.3)	8.4 (47.1)	13.4 (56.1)	18.6 (65.5)	23.2 (73.8)	26.8 (80.2)	28.8 (83.8)	29.2 (84.6)	24.0 (75.2)	18.9 (66.0)	12.6 (54.7)	6.5 (43.7)	18.0 (64.4)
Daily mean °C (°F)	1.4 (34.5)	3.2 (37.8)	7.5 (45.5)	12.4 (54.3)	17.1 (62.8)	20.9 (69.6)	22.5 (72.5)	22.2 (72.0)	17.2 (63.0)	12.3 (54.1)	7.3 (45.1)	2.5 (36.5)	12.2 (54.0)
Mean daily minimum °C (°F)	−1.8 (28.8)	−0.8 (30.6)	2.6 (36.7)	6.8 (44.2)	11.4 (52.5)	15.2 (59.4)	16.5 (61.7)	16.4 (61.5)	12.1 (53.8)	7.7 (45.9)	3.6 (38.5)	−0.6 (30.9)	7.4 (45.3)
Record low °C (°F)	−25.4 (−13.7)	−20.6 (−5.1)	−15.5 (4.1)	−5.4 (22.3)	−0.7 (30.7)	4.1 (39.4)	7.7 (45.9)	5.0 (41.0)	−0.1 (31.8)	−4.6 (23.7)	−13.4 (7.9)	−17.6 (0.3)	−25.4 (−13.7)
Average precipitation mm (inches)	63.0 (2.48)	54.5 (2.15)	65.0 (2.56)	63.4 (2.50)	90.9 (3.58)	107.2 (4.22)	80.4 (3.17)	69.9 (2.75)	71.2 (2.80)	74.1 (2.92)	68.8 (2.71)	71.7 (2.82)	880.1 (34.65)
Average precipitation days (≥ 0.1 mm)	14.1	12.8	12.2	12.8	14.0	13.2	10.9	8.6	10.8	11.0	12.2	13.8	146.4
Average snowy days	7.7	6.6	3.7	0.7	0.0	0.0	0.0	0.0	0.0	0.1	2.5	5.8	27.1
Average relative humidity (%)	82.9	77.1	69.7	67.8	69.3	69.7	68.1	69.0	74.5	79.2	81.6	83.5	74.4
Mean monthly sunshine hours	65.0	90.8	148.3	184.8	227.4	254.3	295.9	283.0	194.7	147.7	84.8	54.4	2,031.1
Source: Republic Hydrometeorological Service of Serbia

== Demographics ==
Historical population
Year	Pop.	±% p.a.
1948	53,436	—
1953	59,796	+2.27%
1961	70,534	+2.09%
1971	78,228	+1.04%
1981	84,180	+0.74%
1991	86,875	+0.32%
2002	86,413	−0.05%
2011	79,327	−0.95%
2022	72,062	−0.87%

According to the 2011 census, the ethnic groups in the city of Loznica included majority Serbs (77,685), and smaller numbers of Romani (761), ethnic Muslims (660), Yugoslavs (74), Montenegrins (58) and others.

== Settlements ==
Aside from Loznica, the city includes the following settlements:

- Banja Koviljača
- Baščeluci
- Bradić
- Brezjak
- Brnjac
- Veliko Selo
- Voćnjak
- Gornja Badanja
- Gornja Borina
- Gornja Koviljača
- Gornja Sipulja
- Gornje Nedeljice
- Gornji Dobrić
- Grnčara
- Donja Badanja
- Donja Sipulja
- Donje Nedeljice
- Donji Dobrić
- Draginac
- Zajača
- Jadranska Lešnica
- Jarebice
- Jelav
- Joševa
- Jugovići
- Kamenica
- Klupci
- Kozjak
- Korenita
- Krajišnici
- Lešnica
- Lipnica
- Lipnički Šor
- Lozničko Polje
- Milina
- Meraja
- Novo Selo
- Paskovac
- Ploča
- Pomijača
- Ribarice
- Runjani
- Simino Brdo
- Slatina
- Straža
- Stupnica
- Tekeriš
- Trbosilje
- Trbušnica
- Tršić
- Filipovići
- Cikote
- Čokešina
- Šurice

== Society and culture ==
=== Culture ===
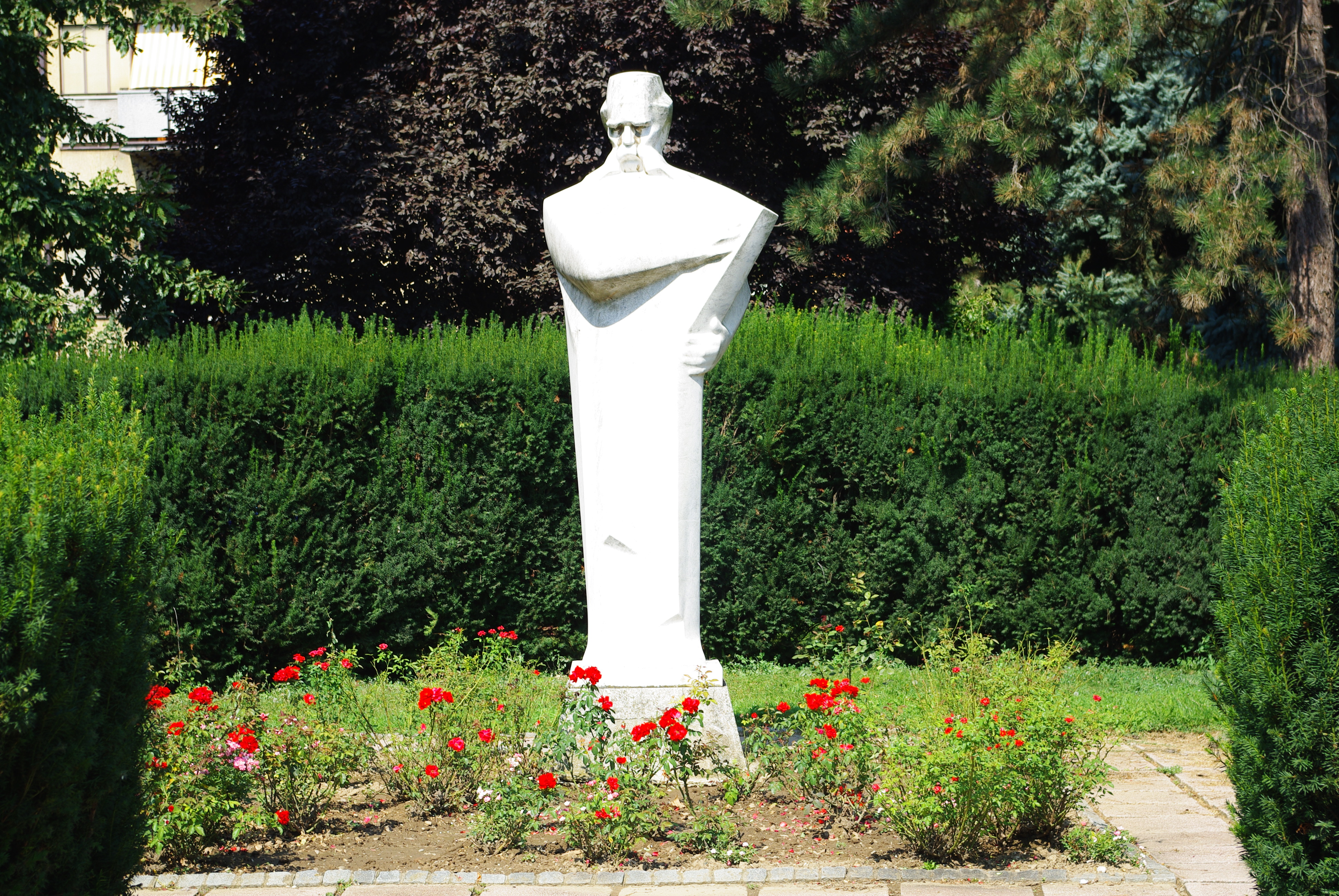
Statue of Vuk Stefanović Karadžić

Among cultural heritage include the Church of the Holy Virgin located in the town, the 14th-century Čokešina Monastery, the 13th-century Tronoša Monastery, and monuments on Gučevo mountain, in Tekeriš, and in Draginac, as well as the ethnic village of Tršić.

A Serbian epic poem is the Battle of Loznica in which the central figure Anta Bogićević leads Serbian forces during the First Serbian Uprising. The most important local cultural event is "Vukov Sabor" (Council of Vuk) in Tršić, dating back from 1933. Held annually in September, in memory of Vuk Stefanović Karadžić who was born in the village, it remains the oldest and largest cultural event in Serbia, for its importance and the increasing volume (20-30,000 visitors).

A museum dedicated to the prominent artists Mića Popović, who was born in Loznica, and Vera Božičković-Popović is located in the center of the town. Jadar Museum is dedicated to local history and covers a period from prehistoric times to 1950.

=== Sport ===
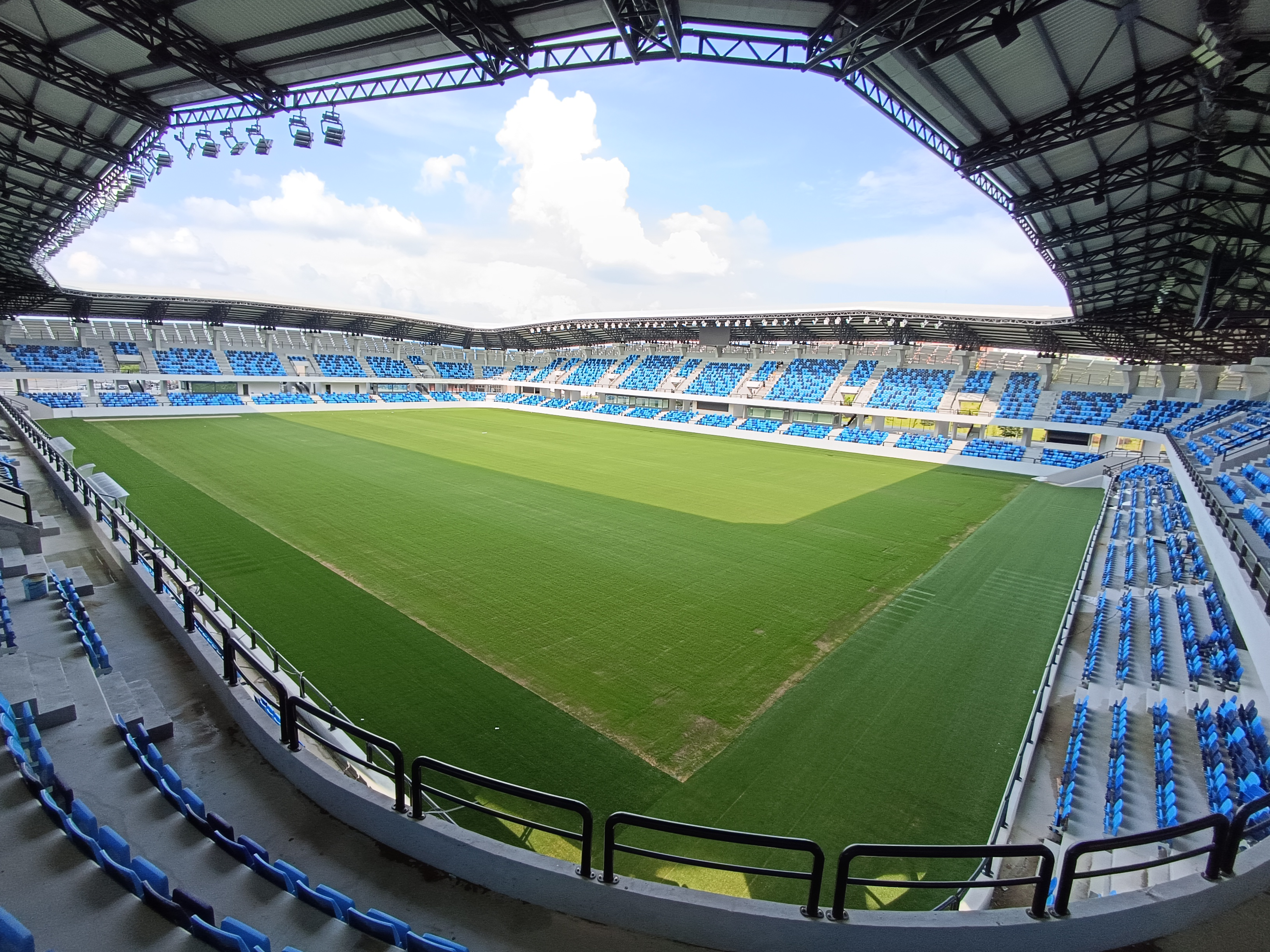
Lagator Stadium, May 2023

Loznica's local football club is called FK Loznica, with the Lagator Stadium as home ground. As of the 2025-26 season, they compete in the Serbian First League, the second tier of the national league system.

== Economy ==
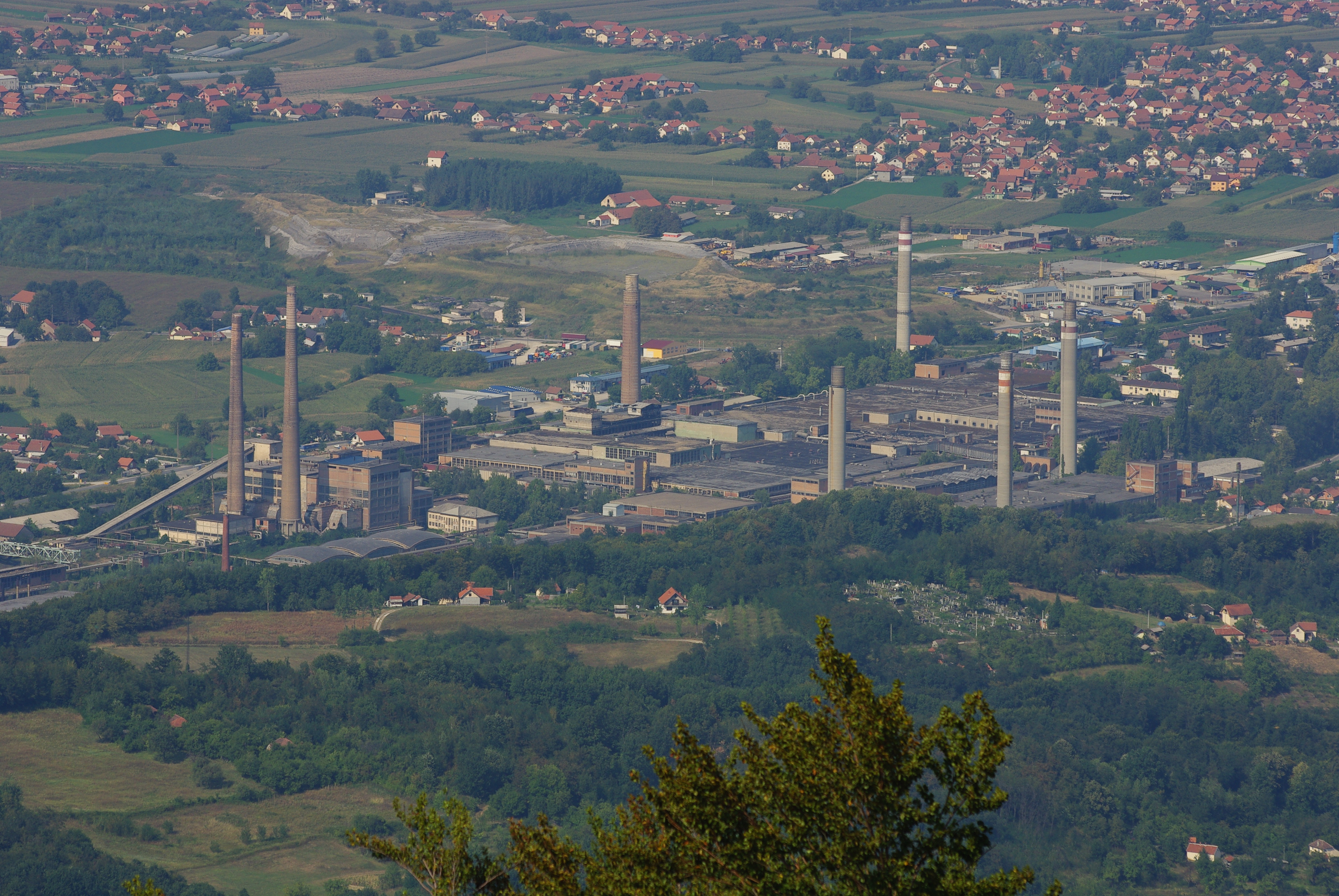
Viskoza factory

The largest factory of Loznica was "HI Viskoza Loznica", founded in 1957 with over 10,000 employees (1981), at the time when the city had 18,000 inhabitants. Production of trailers was primarily in the factory "FAK Loznica", and textile production in "Moda" Loznica.

Italian manufacturer of stockings and women's underwear "Golden Lady" has a factory in Loznica, exporting to countries of the European Union. For now the factory employs 550 workers.

Also, one of the largest lithium deposits (Jadar mine) in Serbia with total reserves of 125.3 million tonnes is located in Loznica.

The following table gives a preview of total number of registered people employed in legal entities per their core activity (as of 2022):

Activity	Total
Agriculture, forestry and fishing	112
Mining and quarrying	89
Manufacturing	6,510
Electricity, gas, steam and air conditioning supply	239
Water supply; sewerage, waste management and remediation activities	188
Construction	1,859
Wholesale and retail trade, repair of motor vehicles and motorcycles	2,864
Transportation and storage	900
Accommodation and food services	780
Information and communication	124
Financial and insurance activities	187
Real estate activities	41
Professional, scientific and technical activities	653
Administrative and support service activities	282
Public administration and defense; compulsory social security	869
Education	1,324
Human health and social work activities	1,934
Arts, entertainment and recreation	259
Other service activities	387
Individual agricultural workers	756
Total	20,357

== Twin cities ==
- Płock, Poland
- Ivanić-Grad, Croatia

== Notable people ==
- Jovan Cvijić, geographer, president of the Serbian Royal Academy of Sciences and rector of the University of Belgrade
- Vuk Stefanović Karadžić, linguist, born in Tršić, educated in Tronoša
- Anta Bogićević, Serbian voivode during the First Serbian Uprising
- Mića Popović, painter, author, and filmmaker
- Saša Janković, Ombudsman of Serbia
- Dragan Kojić Keba, singer
- Sinan Sakić, singer
- Momčilo Spremić, historian
- Zlatko Junuzović, Austrian football player
- Aleksandra Crvendakić, basketball player, Olympic bronze medalist
- Branko Lazić, basketball player, EuroBasket silver medalist
- Aleksandar Gligoric, actor
- Dragan Mićanović, Serbian actor
- Milinko Pantić, Serbian football player and coach.
- Mihailo Petrović, Serbian football player and coach.

== Gallery ==
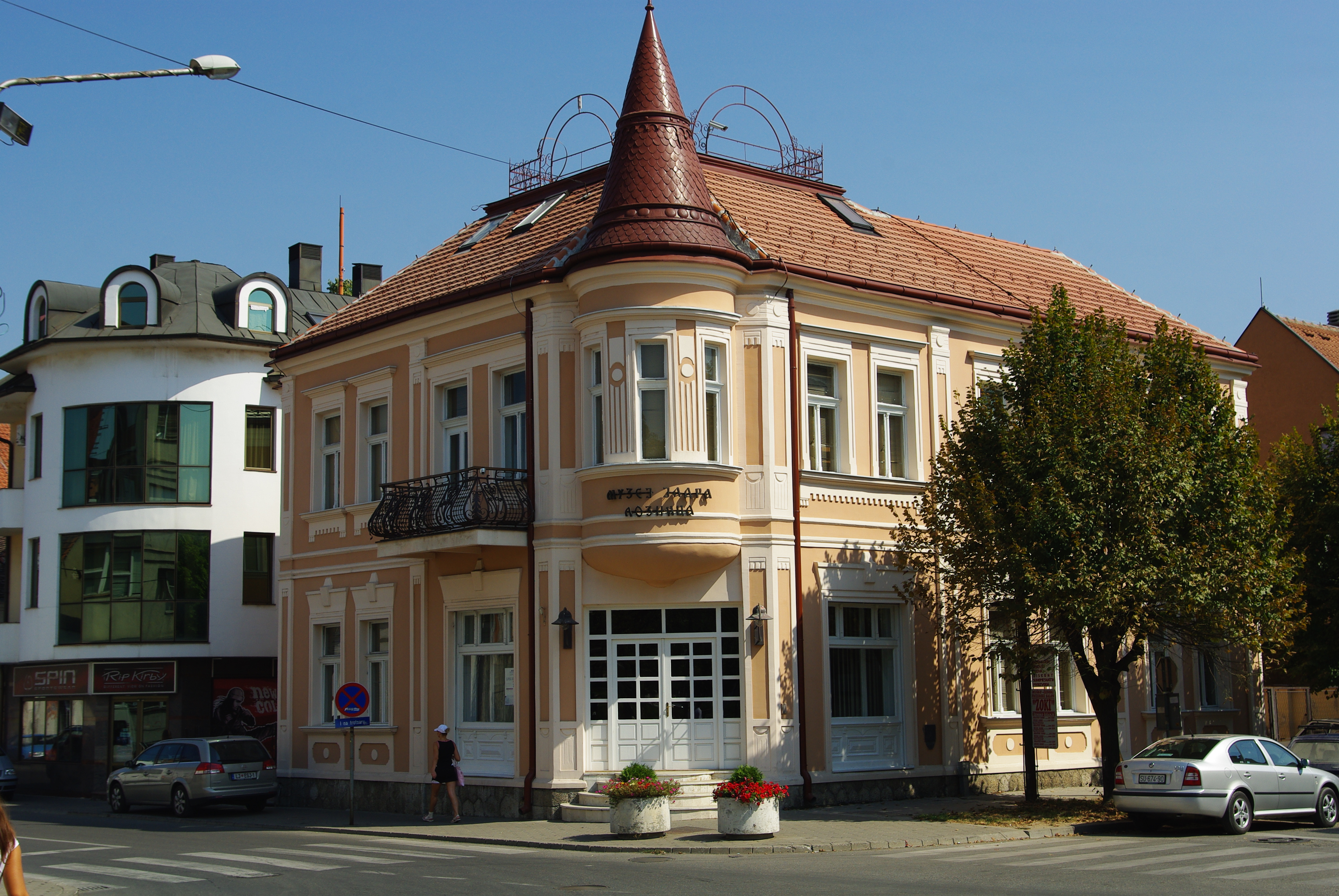
Museum in Loznica

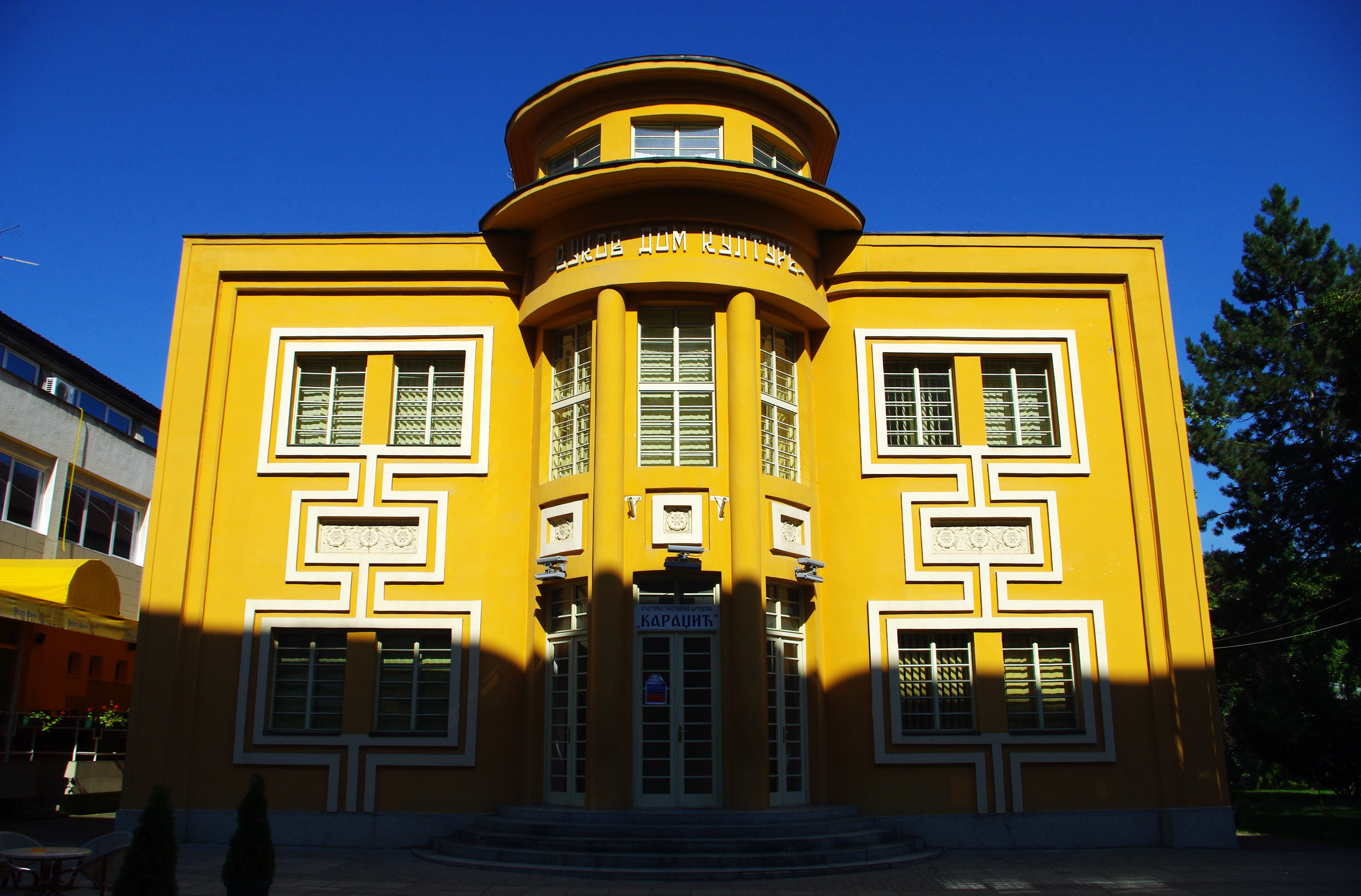
Vukov Dom

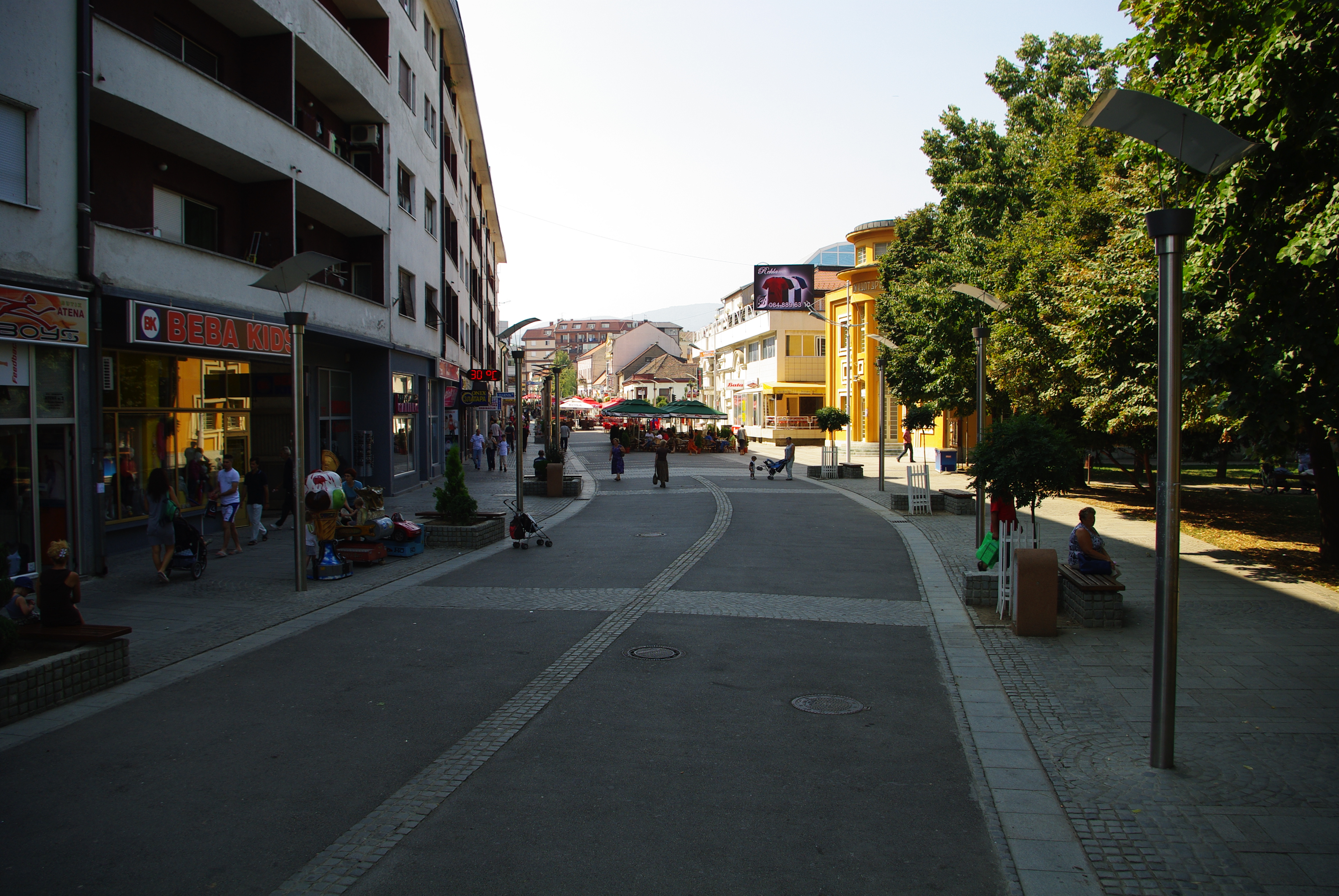
Corso in Loznica

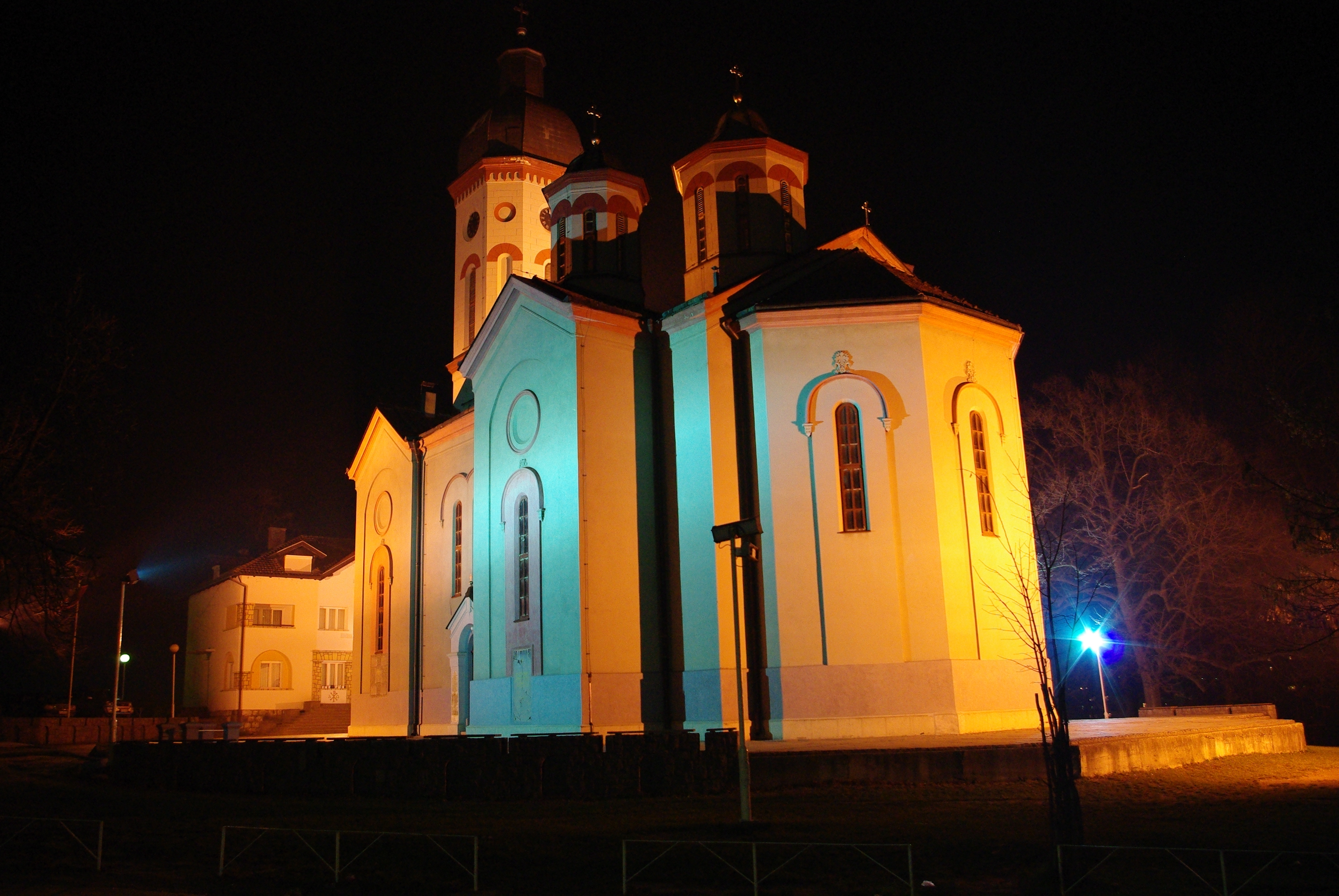
Church in Loznica

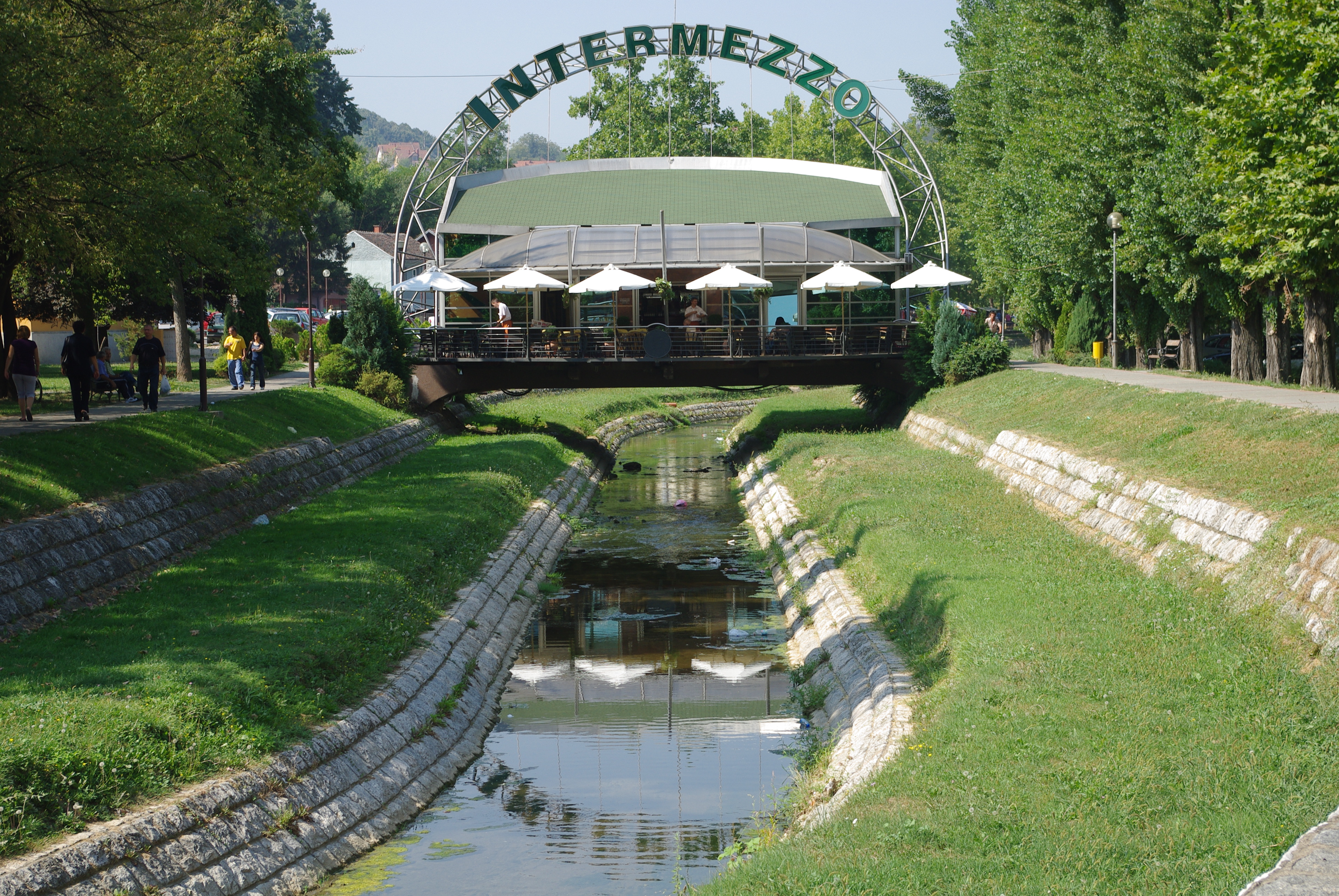
Creek Stira

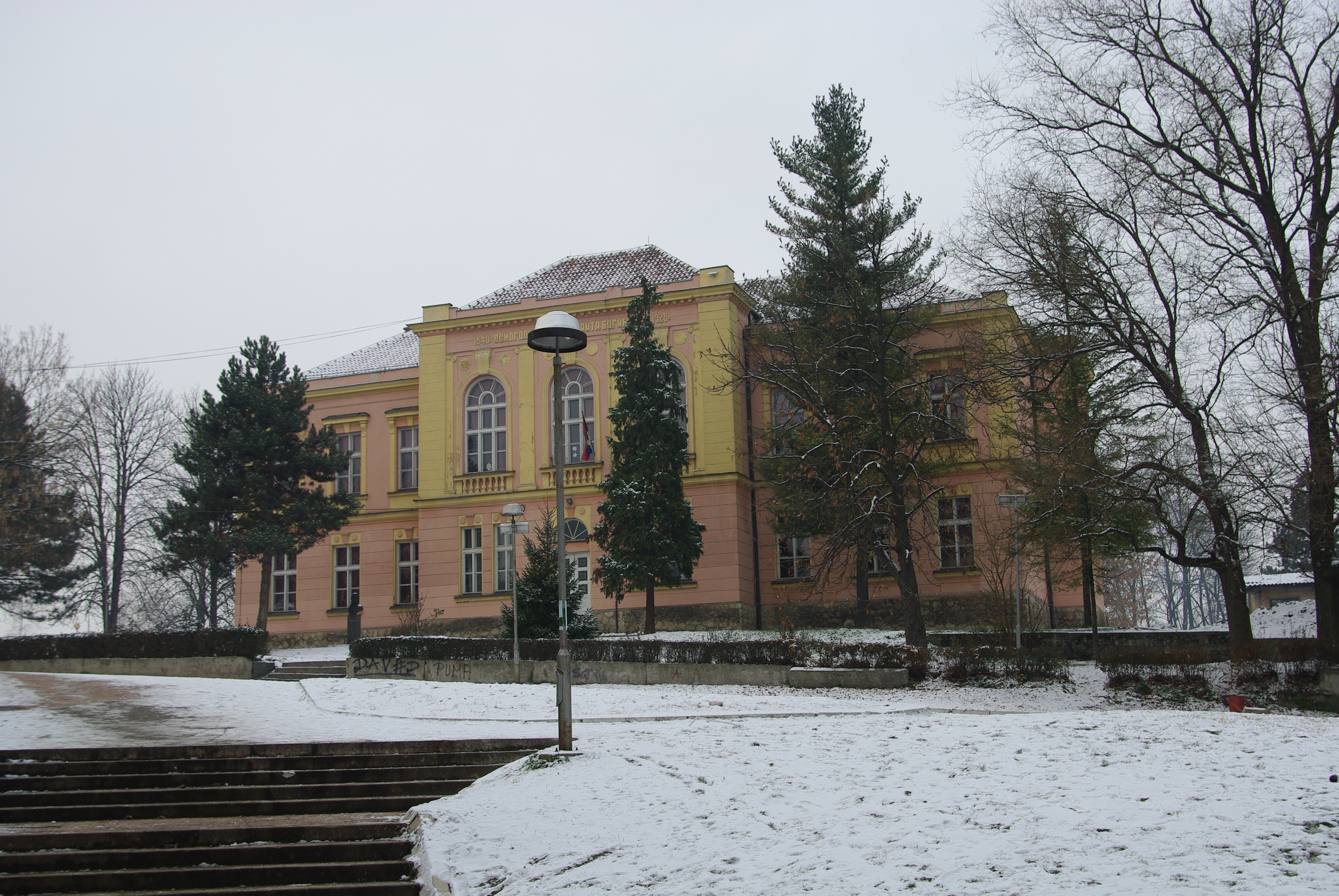
Elementary school Anta Bogićević

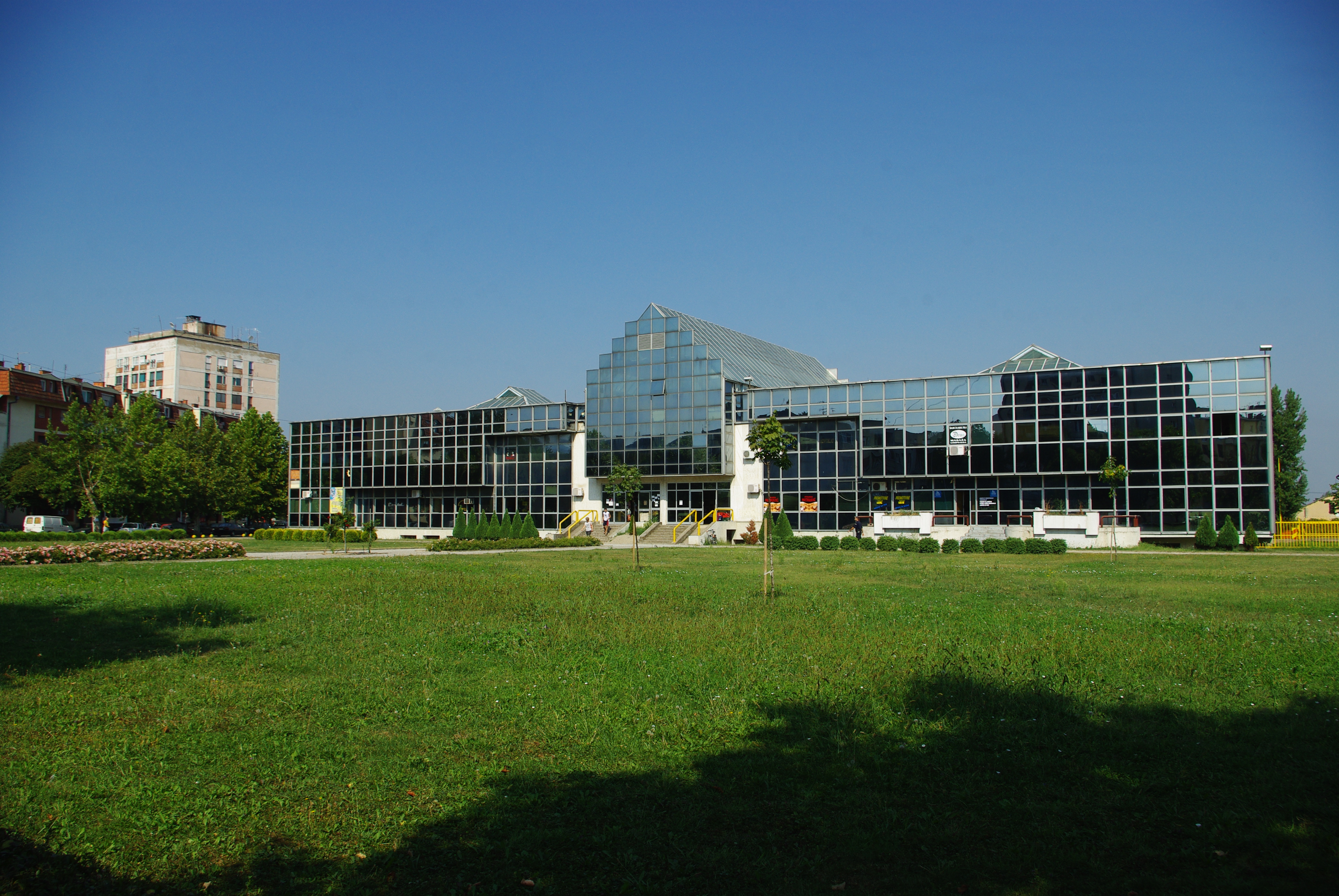
Bus station in Loznica

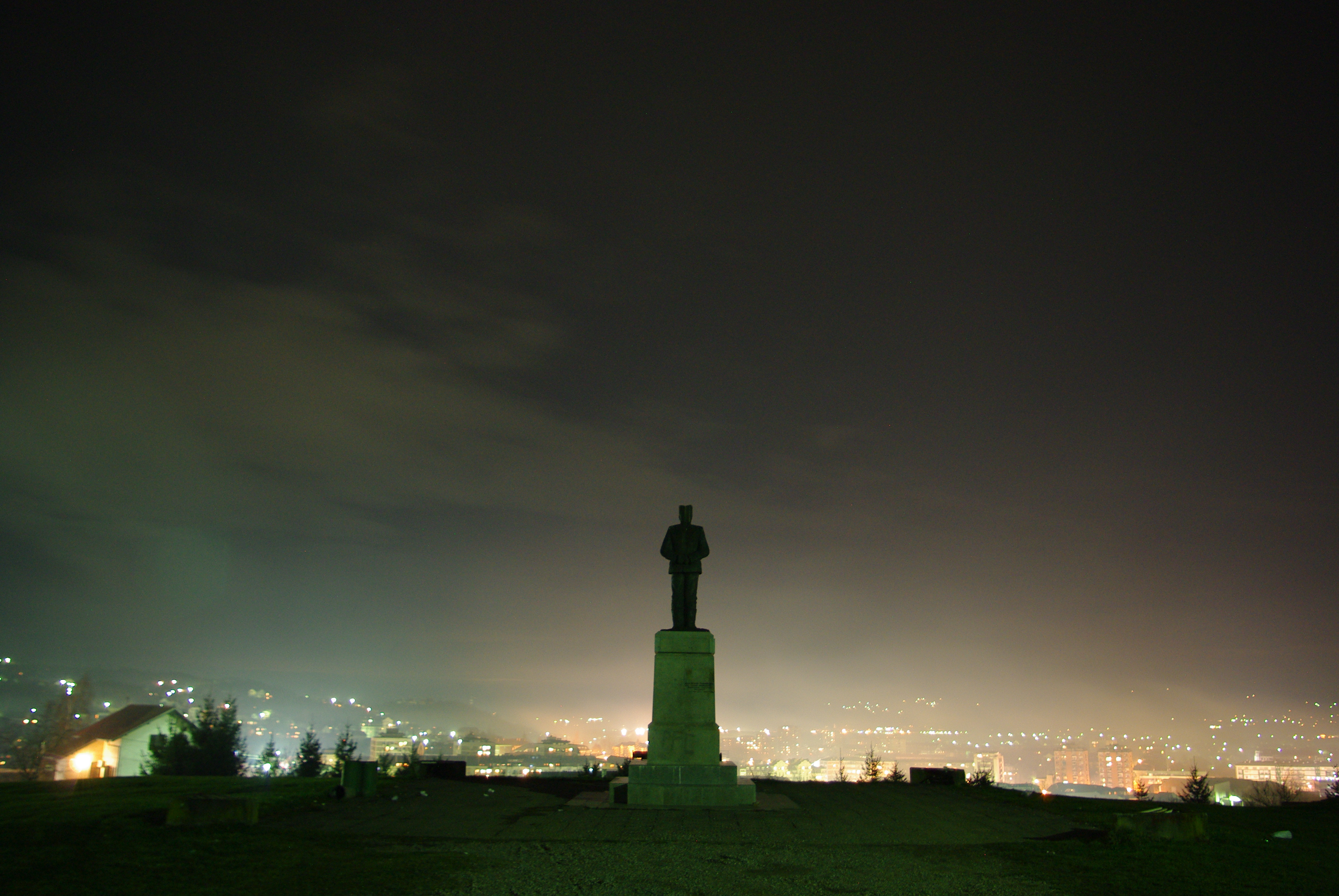
Statue of Vojvoda Stepa Stepanovic

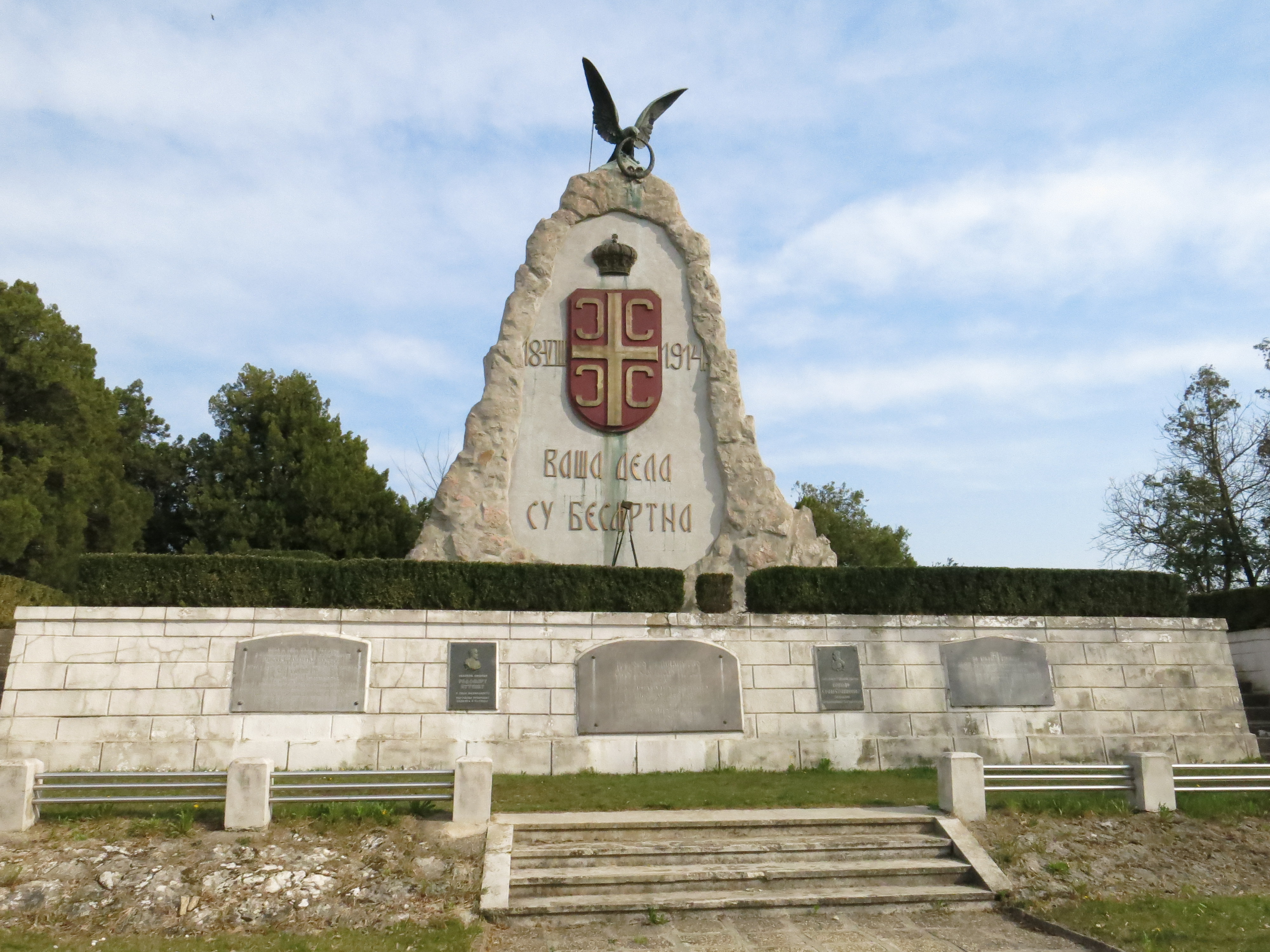
The Memorial Ossuary in Tekeriš to the victims of the Battle of Cer

== See also ==
- List of places in Serbia
