= Baščeluci =

Baščeluci Башчелуци (Serbian)
- Village (Selo)
- Location within Serbia
- Coordinates: 44°30′N 19°13′E
- Country: Serbia

Population (2022)
  - Total: 786
- Time zone: UTC+1 (CET)
  - Summer (DST): UTC+2 (CEST)

Baščeluci (Serbian: Башчелуци) is a settlement near the Serbian city of Loznica in the Mačva District. It has a population of 786 as of 2022.

== Name ==
The name of the town in Serbian is plural.
