= Brezjak =

Brezjak Брезјак (Serbian)
- Village (Selo)
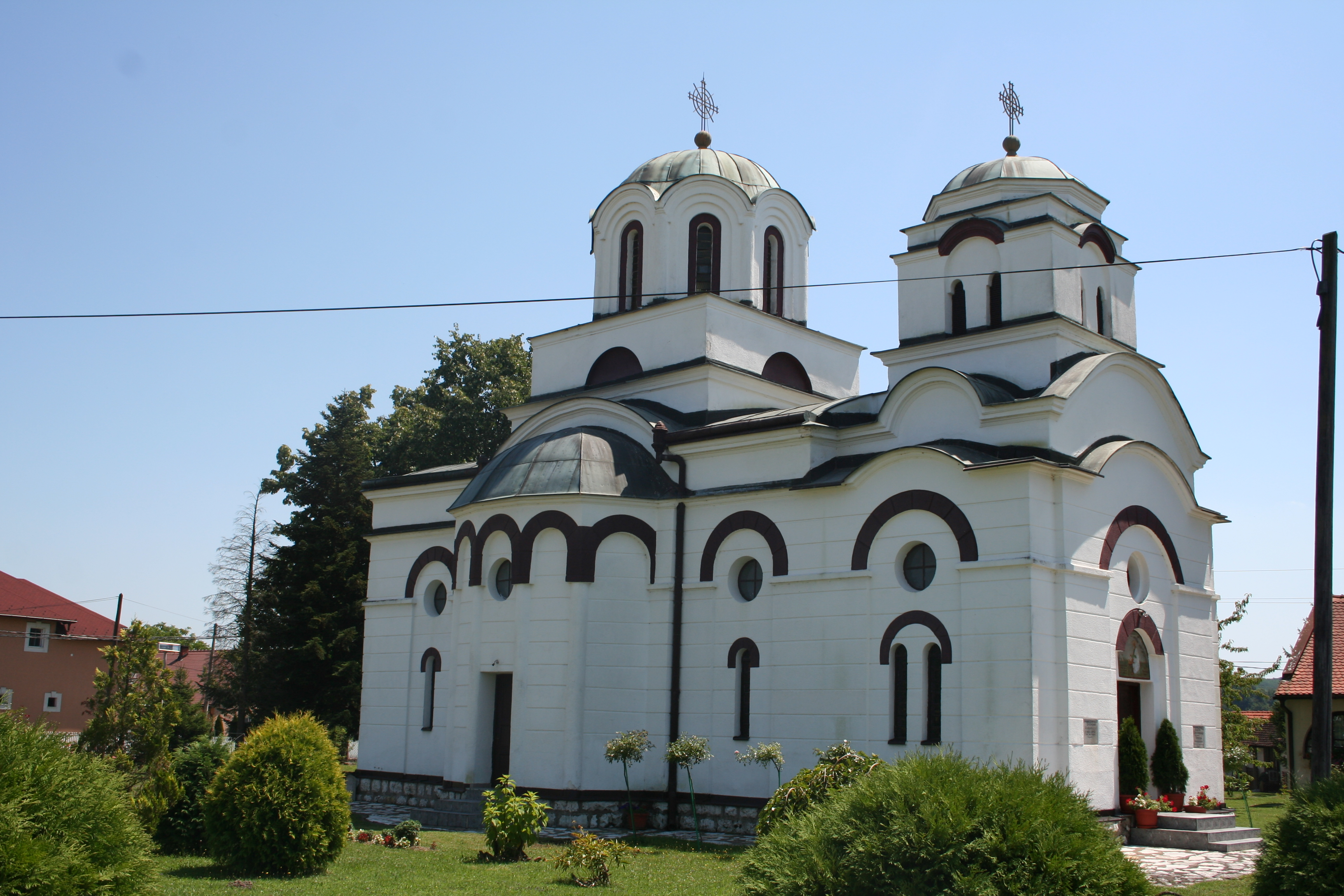

- Location within Serbia
- Coordinates: 44°30′34″N 19°20′31″E
- Country: Serbia

Population (2022)
  - Total: 96
- Time zone: UTC+1 (CET)
  - Summer (DST): UTC+2 (CEST)

Brezjak (Serbian: Брезјак) is a settlement near the Serbian city of Loznica in the Mačva District. As of 2022, the population is 96.
