= Gornja Koviljača =

Gornja Koviljača Горња Ковиљача (Serbian)
- Village (Selo)
- The Sun River center, 2026

- Location within Serbia
- Coordinates: 44°30′N 19°08′E
- Country: Serbia
- District: Mačva District
- Municipality: Loznica

Population (2022)
  - Total: 463
- Time zone: UTC+1 (CET)
  - Summer (DST): UTC+2 (CEST)

Gornja Koviljača (Serbian pronunciation: [Gornja Koviljača]) is a village in the municipality of Loznica, Serbia. The village has a population of 463 people (2022 census) and has a sports and recreational center.

== Demographics ==
According to the 2022 census, the village has a population of 463 people. Between 1953 and 1991, a population increase was observed.

== Geography and attractions ==
Gornja Koviljača is located in Loznica municipality of Western Serbia, 15 km away from the city of the same name. The Drina River passes by Gornja Koviljača. Along the river, Gornja Koviljača is home to "The Sun River," a sports and recreational center. An international dog show was hosted in the center in April 2025. River beaches and horse farms are also situated in the village.

Historical population
Year	Pop.	±% p.a.
1948	237	—
1953	310	+5.52%
1961	421	+3.90%
1971	545	+2.62%
1981	574	+0.52%
1991	586	+0.21%
2002	585	−0.02%
2011	539	−0.91%
2022	463	−1.37%
