= Voćnjak =

Voćnjak Воћњак (Serbian)
- Village (Selo)
- Location within Serbia
- Coordinates: 44°30′17″N 19°15′10″E
- Country: Serbia
- District: Mačva District
- Municipality: Loznica

Population (2002)
  - Total: 1,204
- Time zone: UTC+1 (CET)
  - Summer (DST): UTC+2 (CEST)

Voćnjak is a village in the municipality of Loznica, Serbia. According to the 2002 census, the village has a population of 1204 people.
