= Kozjak (Loznica) =

Kozjak Козјак (Serbian)
- Village (Selo)
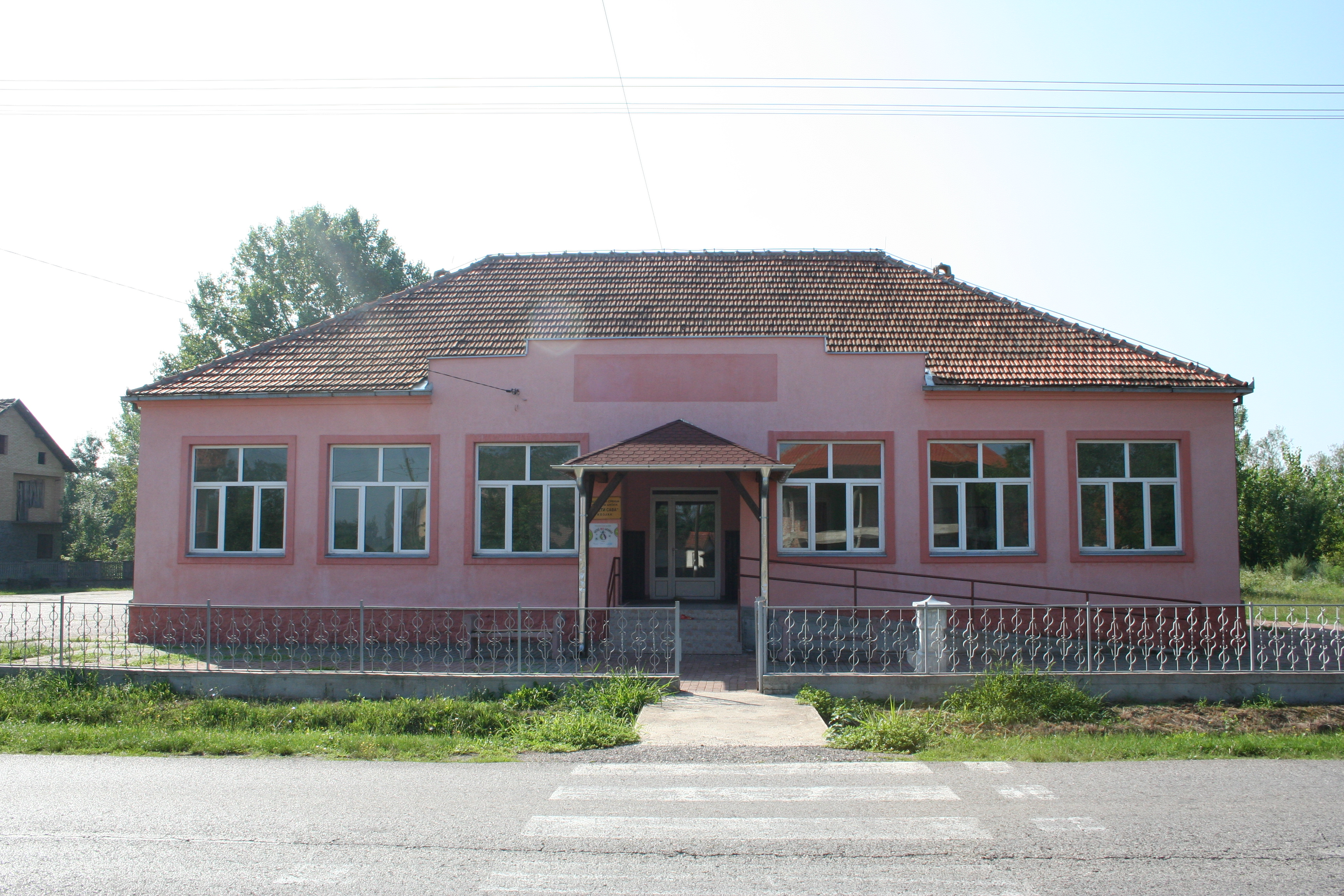
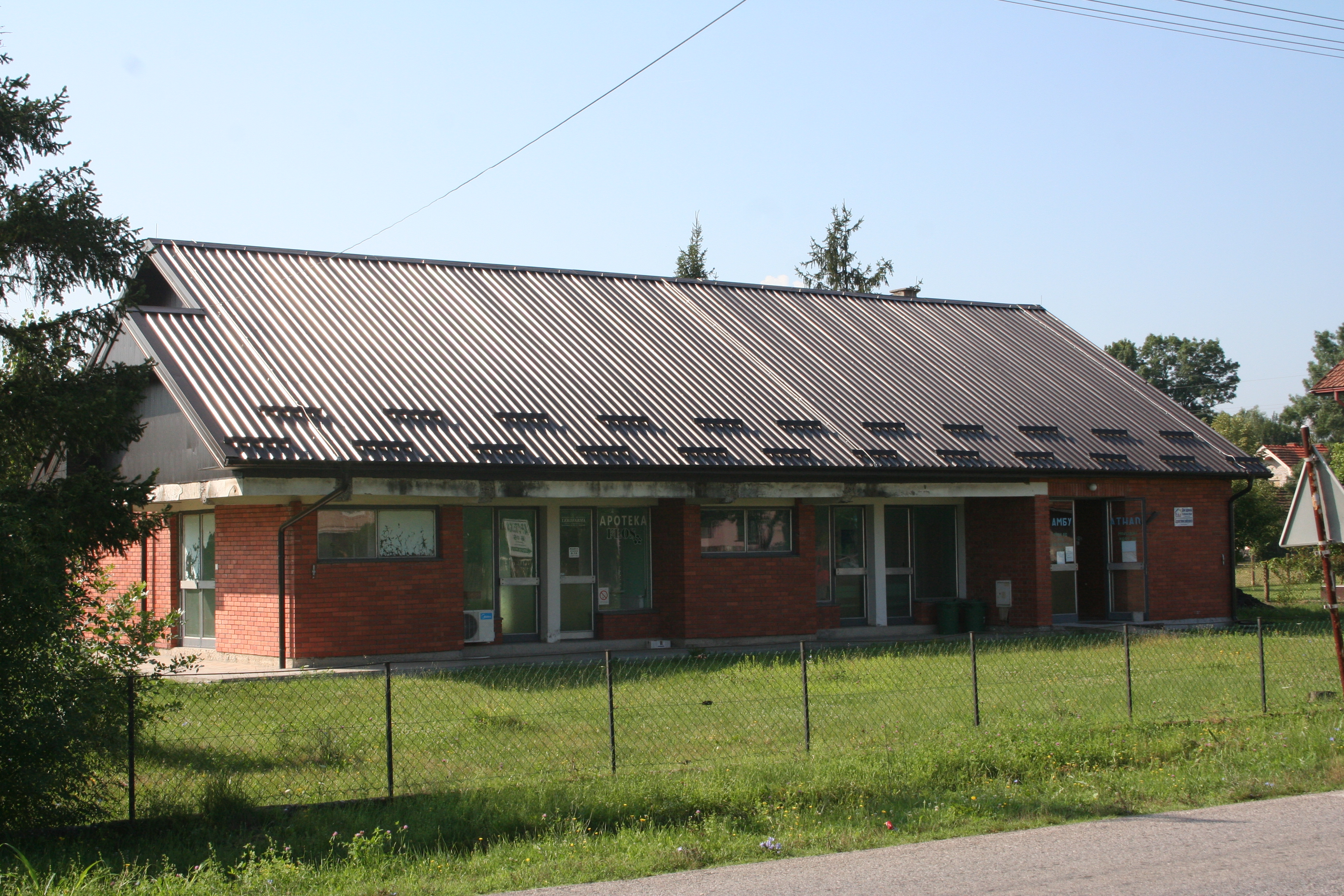
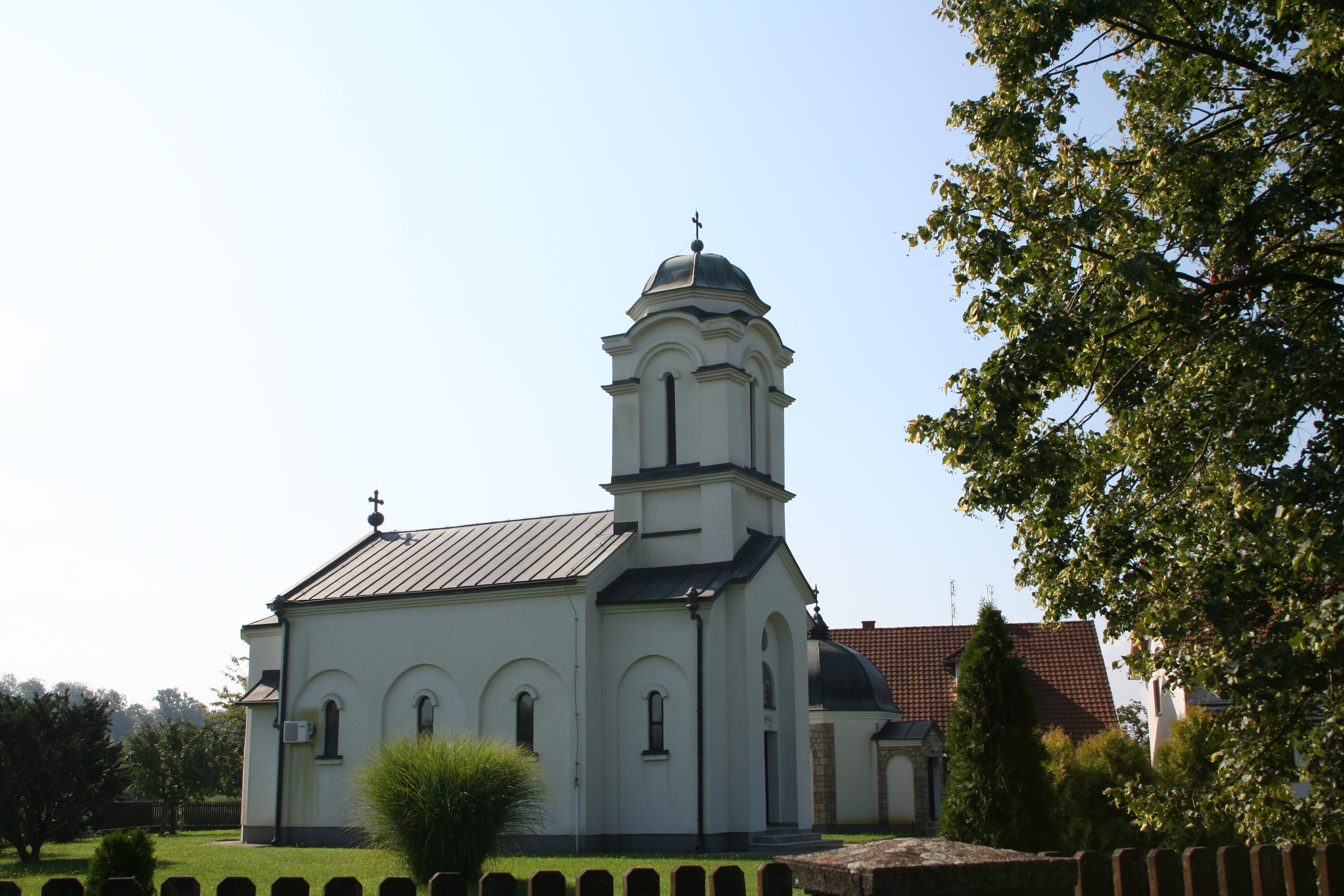
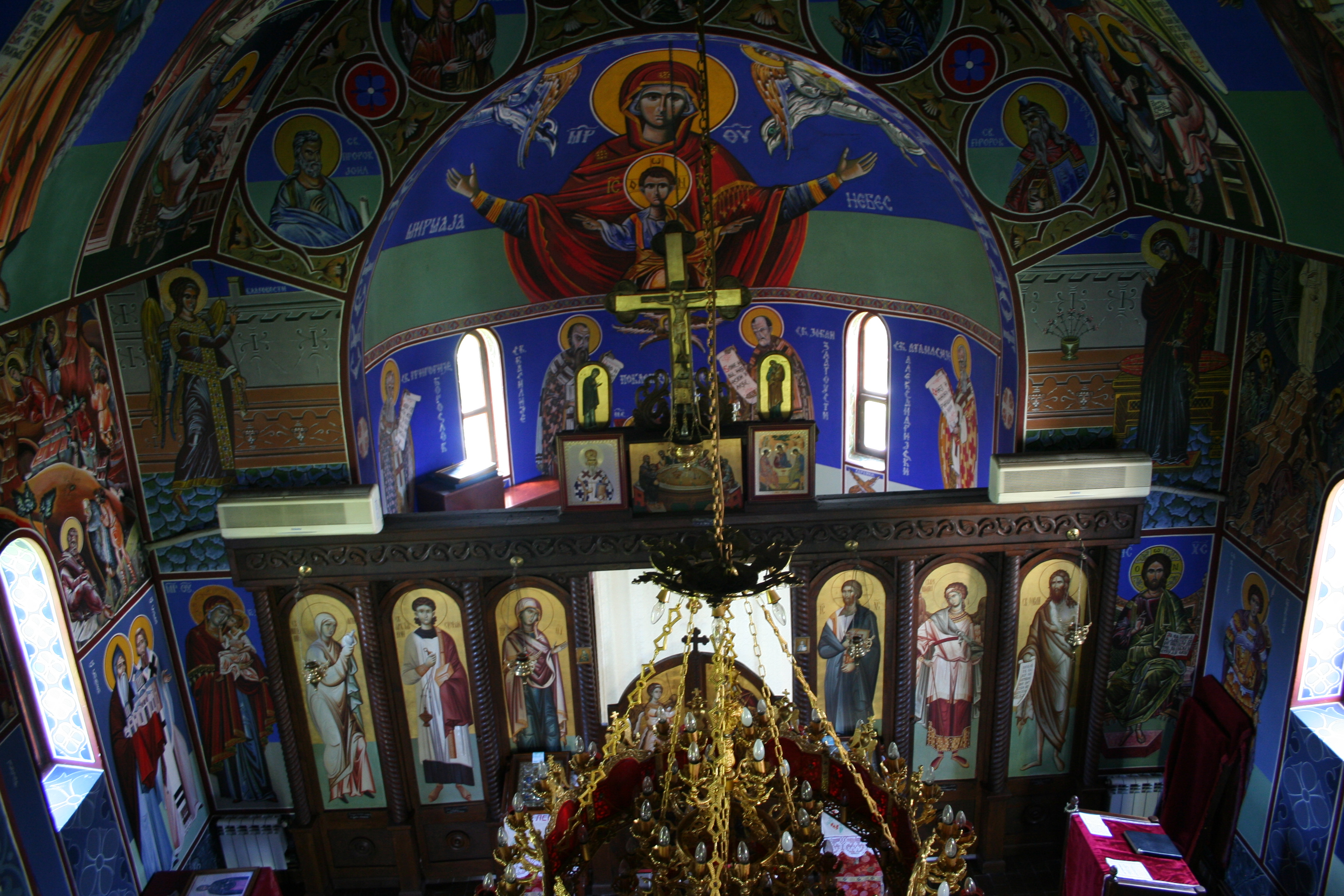
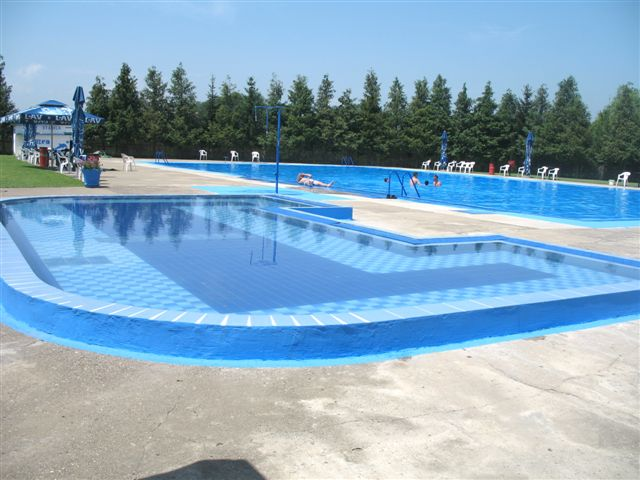

- Location within Serbia
- Coordinates: 44°35′7″N 19°17′2″E
- Country: Serbia
- District: Mačva District
- Municipality: Loznica
- Elevation: 384 ft (117 m)

Population (2011)
  - Total: 1,025
- Time zone: UTC+1 (CET)
  - Summer (DST): UTC+2 (CEST)

Kozjak is a village in the municipality of Loznica, Serbia. According to the 2002 census, the village has a population of 1,102 people.
