= Krajišnici (Loznica) =

Coordinates: 44.5206°N 19.2203°E

Krajišnici Крајишници (Serbian)
- Village (Selo)
- Interactive map of Krajišnici
- Country: Serbia
- District: Mačva District
- Municipality: Loznica

Population (2002)
  - Total: 1,048
- Time zone: UTC+1 (CET)
  - Summer (DST): UTC+2 (CEST)

Krajišnici is a village in the municipality of Loznica, Serbia. According to the 2002 census, the village has a population of 1048 people.
