= Gornja Sipulja =

Gornja Sipulja Горња Сипуља (Serbian)
- Village (Selo)
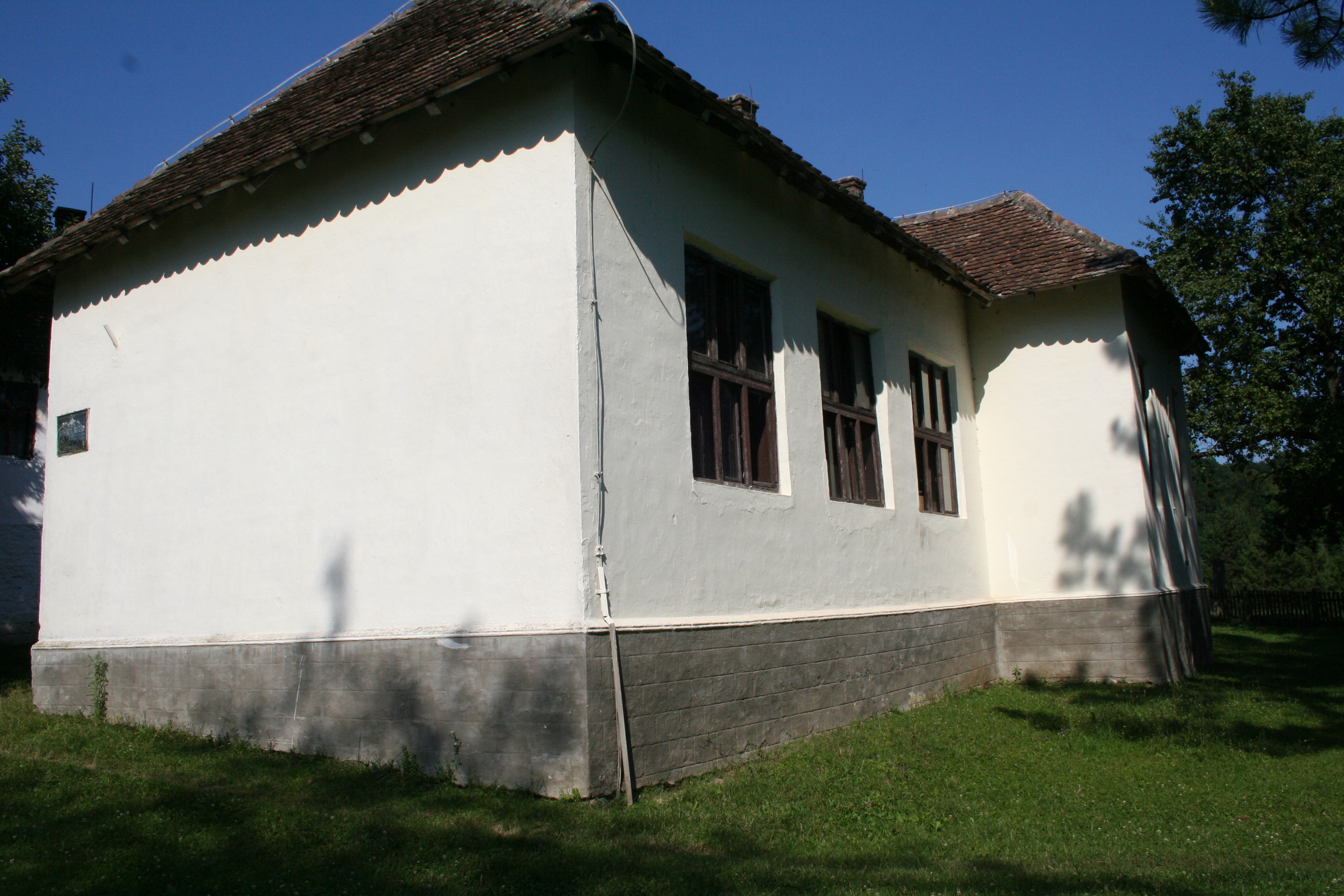

- Location within Serbia
- Coordinates: 44°30′N 19°33′E
- Country: Serbia
- District: Mačva District
- Municipality: Loznica

Population (2002)
  - Total: 250
- Time zone: UTC+1 (CET)
  - Summer (DST): UTC+2 (CEST)

Gornja Sipulja is a village in the municipality of Loznica, Serbia. As of the 2002 census, the village's population was 250 people.
