= Paskovac =

Paskovac Пасковац (Serbian)
- Village (Selo)
- Location within Serbia
- Coordinates: 44°28′N 19°13′E
- Country: Serbia
- District: Mačva District
- Municipality: Loznica

Population (2002)
  - Total: 687
- Time zone: UTC+1 (CET)
  - Summer (DST): UTC+2 (CEST)

Paskovac is a village in the municipality of Loznica, Serbia. According to the 2002 census, the village has a population of 687 people.

Paskovac's population in 2011 consisted of 47% women and 53 % males whose ages ranged from 17- 65 and above.
