= Bradić, Loznica =

Bradić Брадић (Serbian)
- Village (Selo)
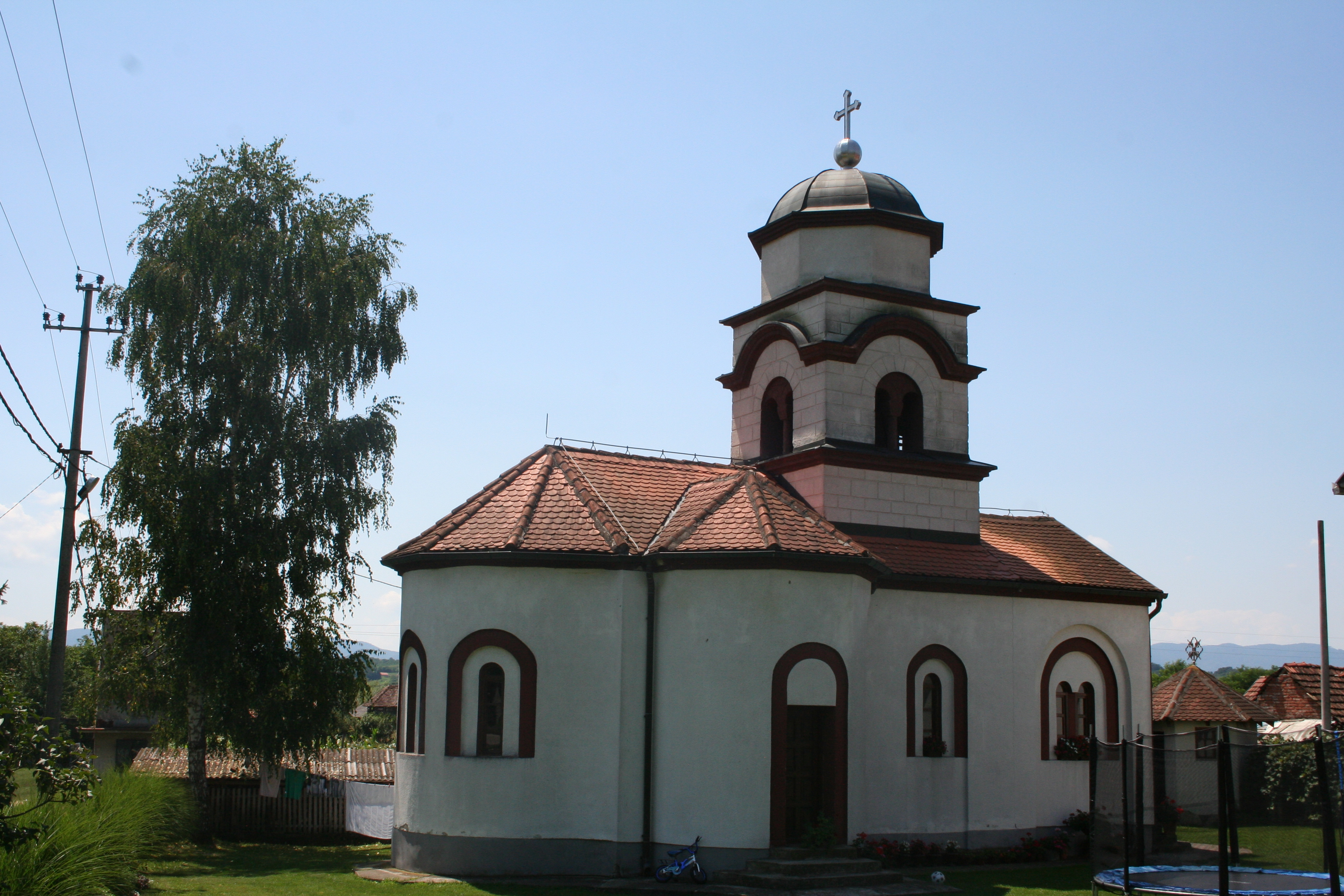

- Location within Serbia
- Coordinates: 44°32′N 19°20′E
- Country: Serbia
- Time zone: UTC+1 (CET)
  - Summer (DST): UTC+2 (CEST)

Bradić (Serbian: Брадић) is a settlement near the Serbian city of Loznica in the Mačva District. As of 2011, the town counted 732 inhabitants.
