= Veliko Selo (Loznica) =

Veliko Selo Велико Село (Serbian)
- Village (Selo)
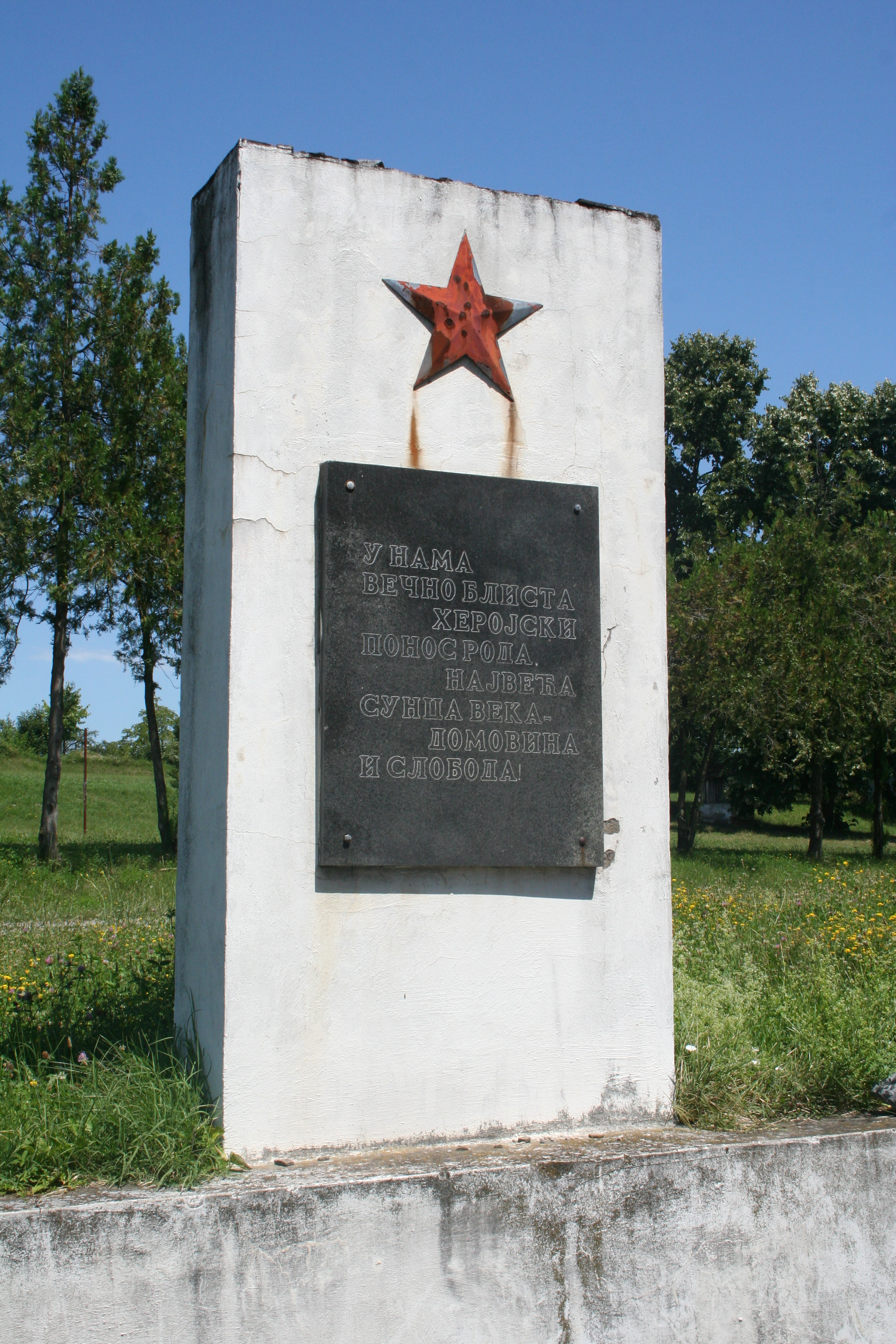

- Location within Serbia
- Coordinates: 44°33′04″N 19°23′08″E
- Country: Serbia
- Time zone: UTC+1 (CET)
  - Summer (DST): UTC+2 (CEST)

Veliko Selo (Serbian: Велико Село) is a settlement near the Serbian city of Loznica in the Mačva District. It has a population of 446.
