= Siege of Šabac =

The Siege of Šabac may refer to:

- Siege of Šabac (1521)
- Siege of Šabac (1788)
- Siege of Šabac (1804)
- Siege of Šabac (1806)
