= Čokešina Monastery =

Monastery in Serbia

Coordinates: 44.6416°N 19.3962°E

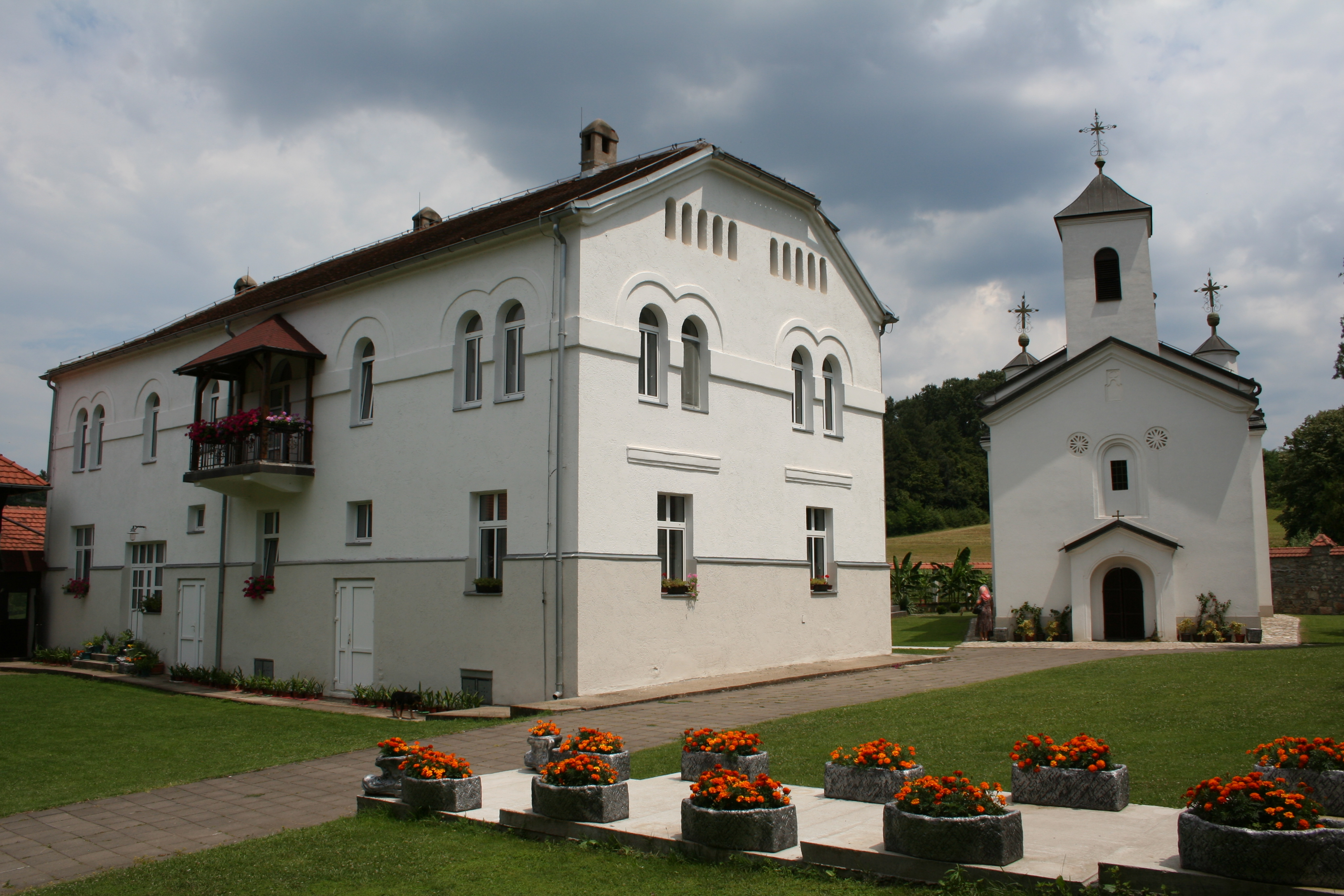

The Čokešina Monastery is a monastery in Čokešina, Serbia, that belongs to the Diocese of Šabac of the Serbian Orthodox Church. It is located at the foot of Vidojevica, on the Cer mountain. The head of the monastery is the abbess Ana Petrović.

The Monastery of Čokešina represents an immovable cultural asset as a cultural monument of great importance.

== Legend and origin ==
There is a famous Monument to Serbian insurgents of the First Serbian Uprising, participants in the Battle of Čokešina. According to the legend, the monastery is the endowment of Miloš Obilić. The monastery, like the village, is named after Bogdan Čokeša, a former landowner from Mačva. In 1458, it became the property of the great nobleman Stefan Ratković, and two preserved stone slabs on the floor of the church date from that time. In the period from 1707 to 1732, after the great migration under Patriarch Arsenije Čarnojević, there was a school in the monastery headed by Abbot Vasilije. The Turks then set fire to and demolished the monastery. On the old foundations in 1786, a new church was built, which was demolished again during the First Serbian Uprising when the battle between Serbs and Turks took place there, known as the Battle of Čokešina. A monument with a tomb was erected in the monastery gate in memory of the Serbian insurgents.

== Contemporary period ==
Today's church of the Čokešina monastery was built between 1820 and 1823, thanks to Prince Miloš and his brother Jevrem. The church is dedicated to the birth of the Most Holy Mother of God. The iconostasis is from 1834, and the upstairs boarding house is from 1918. In September 1941, the monastery was destroyed during a bombing attack, and it was rebuilt in 1962. At one time there was a hospital and a place of residence for poor children from various parts of the country.

During the World War II, the head of the monastery was Mitrofan Matić, who was killed in 1941 and buried in the monastery.

== See also ==
- List of Serbian Orthodox monasteries

== Sources ==
- "Diocese of Šabac / Čokešina Monastery". Archived from the original on 24 May 2016. Accessed 18 June 2016.
- Hadzi-Konstantin, abbot of Čokešina, contemporary of the uprising ("Orthodoxy", No. 917, 1 June 2005)
- Text about the Čokešina monastery at the foot of Cer
