= Siege of Šabac (First Serbian Uprising) =

Battle part of the first Serbian uprising

- Part of First Serbian Uprising
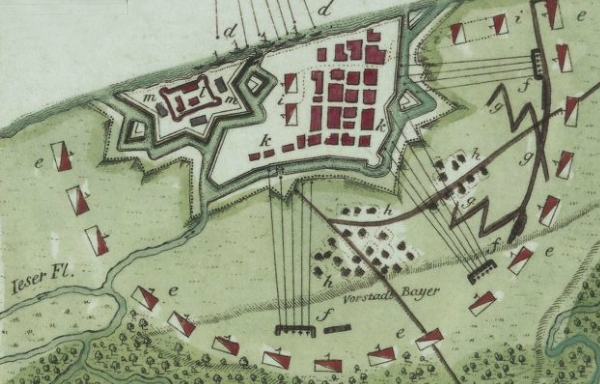
- Map of the Šabac Fortress (1788)
- Type: blockade
- Location: Šabac, Ottoman Empire
- Planned: March 1804, December 1804, 1806
- Commanded by: Jakov Nenadović
- Objective: Blockade and capture of Šabac
- Date: 19 March–28 April 1804; January 1805; 1806
- Executed by: Valjevo nahija rebel army
- Outcome: handover of city to rebels on 6 February 1807

The siege of Šabac was undertaken by the Serbian rebel army detachments led by Jakov Nenadović against the city of Šabac, which supported the Dahije (renegade Janissaries). Šabac was situated in the frontier of rebel territory and was a refuge for the Dahije and their allies, thus, Nenadović set out to force the city into submission. Handed over on 1 May 1804, with the expulsion of the Dahije leader Mus-aga and his allies, the Šabac Turks remained in the fortress, recognized as Imperial possession. After subsequently giving refuge to Mus-aga, the Serbian rebels failed to surprise attack the city in 1805. The city was attacked many times in 1806 and was finally handed over on 6 February 1807 following the liberation of Belgrade.

== Background ==
During the Slaughter of the Knezes, the Dahije commander Mus-aga Fočić and his Janissaries killed three Orthodox clergymen at Šabac.

On 27 February [O.S. 15 February] 1804, or the following day, the Serb notables of the Valjevo nahiya gathered at the Brankovina height (Brankovački vis) and decided to rise up against the Dahije. Some 700 men were gathered, but they were ill-equipped. The Šabac Turks called the Sanjak of Zvornik (of the Bosnia Eyalet) to aid against the rebels. Jakov Nenadović took 300 men of Posavina and Tamnava and went to Beljin and fought with the Šabac Turk detachment on 6 March [O.S. 23 February] 1804, with many wounded on both sides, the rebels losing buljubaša Isailo Lazić, and the Turks losing Arpadžić-beg. The Šabac Turk detachment went to support Valjevo via Svileuva, in the hands of priest Luka Lazarević and Ostoja Spužić and their 300–400 men, and they clashed, with daily shootings from the Gomilica mountain. After the rebels destroyed the Bosnian detachment (from Zvornik) at Svileuva, many of the Bosnian soldiers took refuge in Šabac.

The Šabac Turks and their Bosnian allies posed a risk to the Serbs in the surrounding villages. After recuperating from Svileuva, the Valjevo nahija army gathered and set out to take Šabac.

== 1804 ==
=== 1804 siege ===
On 19 March [O.S. 7 March] 1804 (dated by Milićević) the Serbian rebels appeared outside Šabac and proceeded to attack the city, pushed the Turks out from the Bair neighbourhood, set fire on many Turk houses, and managed to close in the Turks and Janissaries inside the Šabac Fortress. The fortress was encircled and the rebels shot from all sides. Among participants were, apart from commander Jakov Nenadović, his nephew archpriest Matija Nenadović, priest Luka Lazarević, the hajduk Nedić brothers, knez Stanko from Bošnjane, knez Todor from Žabari, knez Andreja Vitomirović from Drenovac, and Ostoja Spuž from Šabac. The Janissaries (numbering c. 300), Šabac Turks and Bosnian soldiers held firm defense in the fortress, until a cannon arrived at the rebel camp, gifted by Habsburg Serb bishop Jovanović of Novi Sad. The cannon bombarded the fortress, and destroyed houses inside it, weakening the defenders morale. At this point, many among the Šabac yerli (natives) sought the survival of their families rather than supporting the Janissaries and Bosnian soldiers. During the siege, the pinned down Mus-aga sent requests to Ali Pasha Vidajić of Zvornik to send reinforcements, and on 25 March he sent a request for reinforcement and help from the Dahije in Belgrade.

The Šabac Turks bought food and other necessities at Klenak on Habsburg territory, and there they began to discuss with Serbs regarding peace between the two peoples. Matija Nenadović negotiated with Šabac Turk representatives, demanding that they give up Mus-aga Fočić and his followers and the Bosnians, and the fortress, with the Šabac Turks, would be left alone as an Ottoman imperial possession. The Šabac Turks were not allowed to enter Serb villages, a Serb would judge a Serb in judicial matters, and the Muslim judge only fellow Muslims. After several meetings and negotiations, some mediated by Austrian Military Frontier officers Stojićević and Kosta Jovanović (both Habsburg Serbs that supported the rebel cause), the Šabac Turks agreed to the conditions and signed a written contract with the Serbs on 28 April [O.S. 16 April] 1804. Mus-aga Fočić and his Janissaries and Bosnian soldiers left via Austrian territory for Belgrade.

A hajduk army of 300 was destroyed at Čokešina (28 April) by reinforcements from Zvornik, and despite the Serb loss, it was instrumental in the siege of Šabac, as it made it impossible to support the besieged due to casualties, and the reinforcements retreated back to Bosnia.

The Šabac Turks remained in the fortress, and although the city submitted to the Serb rebels, it was recognized as the Sultan's property, and the rebels put a 20-man guard under the command of Pavle from Vukona inside the fortress to ensure safety for Serbs working or trading in the city.

=== Ćurčija's campaign and Mus-aga's incursion ===
In mid-June 1804, a large Serbian rebel army with the most important commanders mustered outside Belgrade, leading the Sultan to send Vizier Bekir Pasha of Bosnia with the mission to stop the fighting between the Dahije and Serbs, to bring peace and security to the Belgrade Pashalik and Ottoman frontier.

On 26 June [O.S. 14 June] 1804, Đorđe Ćurčija, falling out with supreme leader Karađorđe following the takeover of Požarevac in late May, decided to go to Šabac and Mačva where he removed the administration put there by Jakov Nenadović and appointed his own people. From Mačva, Ćurčija raided Podrinje (part of the Sanjak of Zvornik) and rose the Serbs of the region. Ćurčija sent a detachment to Loznica which took over the town without a fight, and another to Lješnica, which was taken after a hard battle. Ali Pasha Vidajić retook Loznica and Lješnica after defeating Todor Bojinović in the Ranitovača forest. The rebels failed to retake Loznica in another attempt. Ćurčija also had a quarrel with Luka Lazarević.

During the battles in Podrinje, Mus-aga Fočić had collected cavalrymen in Bosnia and was joined by Janissary agha Bego Novljanin, and crossed, unnoticed, the Drina and Mačva with 1,000 troops and arrived at Šabac on 18 August [O.S. 6 August] 1804, where he dug up his hidden ducats and beheaded more than 70 Serbs then retreated to Bosnia. Mus-aga's force numbered 1,000, and was also accompanied by Ali Bey and Poreč-Alija, the former mütesellim of Valjevo. Serdar Ilija's band managed to kill a few of Mus-aga's men in an ambush by the road outside Prnjavor.

For his administrative reorganization in Mačva, and the view that he was held accountable for Mus-aga's breakthrough to Šabac, the rebel leadership sentenced Đorđe Ćurčija to death. Jakov Nenadović and Sima Marković were sent to Mačva to carry out the sentence, meeting with Ćurčija on the premise of discussing the future defense of Mačva, with their men shooting him at Novo Selo.

The Serbian rebels sought to punish Šabac for giving refuge to Dahije commander Mus-aga Fočić, who freely entered and left the town and fortress, and killed many Serbs there. Hearing of the beheadings, supreme commander Karađorđe ordered Jakov Nenadović, Janko Katić and Sima Marković to punish the Šabac Turks. The Dahije's supporters, kırcalı (bandits) under Alija Gušanac, also roamed free in central Serbia, and the rebels needed to rid them in order to more easily expand the rebellion.

== 1805 ==
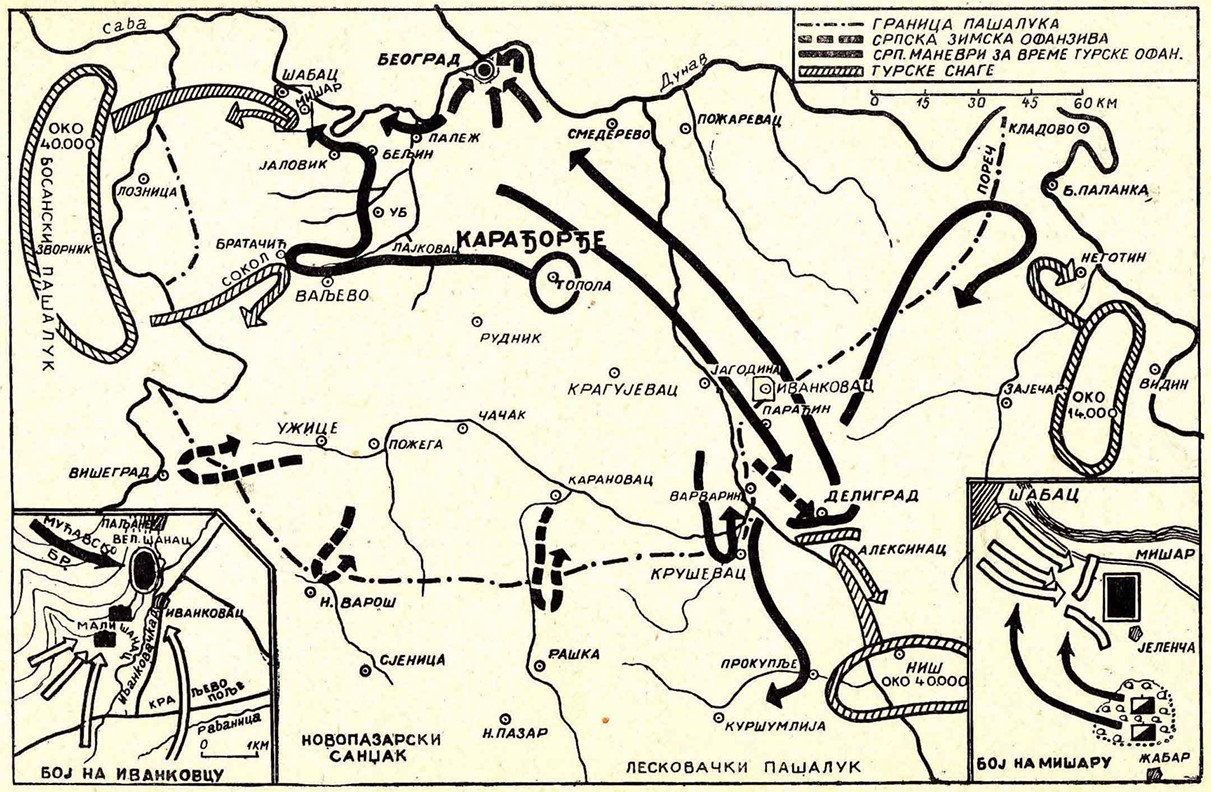
Map of rebel operations in 1805 (in Serbian).

=== January 1805 attack ===
The Serbian leadership chose Jakov Nenadović and Janko Katić to take Šabac, and they decided for a surprise attack. Shortly after Bekir Pasha returned to Bosnia, Jakov and Janko mustered enough of a force to undertake the mission, at Dobrava near Šabac. The first line of rebel troops, including Jakov and Janko, slipped through the fortification gates before sunrise on 3 January [O.S. 22 December] 1805, just as the town imam was to call the morning prayer. K. Nenadović did not give a date, but describes it as early winter. The imam saw the rebels and shouted, alarming the Turks who were on their way to the mosque. The Turks immediately took up weapons and ran towards the gates, shooting at the rebels, forcing them to leave the fortress grounds. The small number of rebels present were unable to withstand; the rest of the rebel force were too far away from the fort, owing to the deep snow and scattered movement. The rebels that escaped the fort were unable to move further due to confusion and being hailed with bullets; with Jakov and Janko, they jumped into the fortress ditches where, fortunately for them, the bastion rifles couldn't target them. They were unable to leave the ditches in day-time as that would risk them being shot from the town. From the fortress walls, the Turks poured boiling water and threw bee hives down to the ditches. For the whole day, the rebels stayed in the cold snow and managed to escape the ditches in pairs only in the night, rushing past the hillocks while shot at by rifles and cannons. In the town, shootouts left 60 dead on each side. The failed attack resulted in Šabac ceasing all communications with Serbs.

=== 1805 siege ===
Jakov had under his general command 4,000 men at the beginning of the year, and part of it was camped towards the Bair neighbourhood of Šabac. In late May 1805, Ali Bey Vidajić set out from Zvornik to help the Šabac garrison of Mus-aga. Ali Bey reportedly was ready to "massacre children down to 7 years old".

== 1806 ==
=== 1806 siege ===
Šabac was attacked many times in 1806 by Jakov Nenadović and Luka Lazarević.

=== Negotiations and handover ===
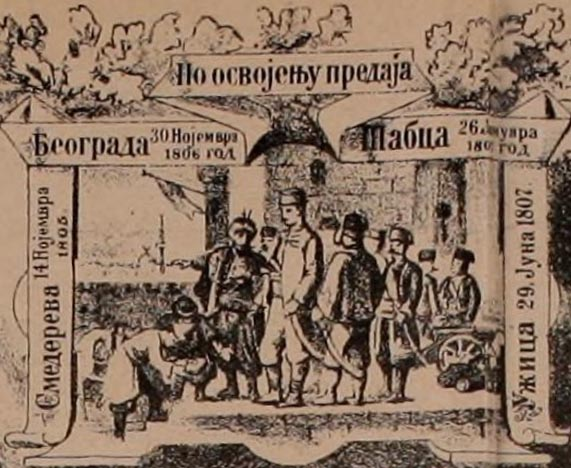
The Ottomans handing over Smederevo, Belgrade, Šabac and Užice.

Following the Battle of Mišar (August 1806), what was left of the Ottoman Bosnian army retreated to Bosnia or Šabac. The commanders Suleyman Pasha, Ibrahim Pasha, Hasan Pasha of Srebrenica, Hasan Pasha of Banja Luka and Ali Bey Vidajić stayed at Šabac with their troops, and they sent a letter to the Metropolitan of Zvornik to help them with negotiating peace in Šabac. The metropolitan met with Jakov, who readied an army outside Šabac, and refused to negotiate without the involvement of supreme leader Karađorđe. Meanwhile, the Imperial muhasil Bekir Agha arrived at Belgrade where he asked kircali (mercenary) leader Alija Gušanac to hand over the city to the Serbs, which he refused. The Šabac Turks asked the Belgrade Vizier Suleyman Pasha to be an intermediary between them and the Serbs. Karađorđe led the liberation of Belgrade, and after the takeover, sent vojvoda Miloje Petrović to Austrian-held Klenak on 4 February [O.S. 23 January] 1807 where he met with Suleyman Pasha, Ibrahim Pasha, Hasan Pasha of Srebrenica and Ali Bey Vidajić, and other Ottoman Bosnian beys, and Serbian leaders Jakov Nenadović, Luka Lazarević, Stojan Čupić and Živko Dabić. The negotiations failed, according to K. Protić due to Austrian colonel Obućina's impatience. In the evening, Karađorđe, Marko Katić and Stanoje Glavaš arrived at Mišar and the Ottoman side declared that they would continue negotiations in Serbian territory, without Austrian meddling. The two sides met above Topoljak, also joined by Matija Nenadović and Miloš Pocerac, and they quickly agreed that Šabac be handed over, its population leave for Bosnia, while a Janissary-agha stay at the fortress with an entourage as an Imperial muhasil (representative).

The Šabac Turks gathered their belongings on 5 February [O.S. 24 January] 1807, and on 6 February [O.S. 25 January] 1807 at 10.00, the men were escorted by land by Stojan Čupić, and the women by river on two large boats. At 01.00, 7 February [O.S. 26 January] 1807, Karađorđe entered the Šabac Fortress, accompanied by all generals and cannon salute and Serbian music, where the Janissary-agha, with 10 men, hand over the keys to the city. At Šabac, the Serbian rebels gained nine cannons, one avan-cannon, many shots and nine crates of gunpowder. Luka Lazarević was appointed the commander of Šabac with a garrison of 1,000 men. After a month, the Janissary-agha left with Belgrade Vizier Suleyman Pasha for Bosnia, and Šabac was completely in Serb hands.

== See also ==
- Timeline of the Serbian Revolution

== Annotations ==
1. The events are known in historiography as "submission of Šabac" (pokorenje Šapca), the "attack on the Šabac fortress" (napad na Šabačku tvrđavu), "receival of Šabac" (dobitak Šapca), etc.
2. There are different dates given to the expulsion and handover, in the time period of 29 April–2 May. According to K. Protić, on 29 April [O.S. 17 April] 1804, Mus-aga Fočić and his Janissaries and Bosnian soldiers left via Austrian territory for Belgrade. According to Milićević, Mus-aga handed over Šabac to Matija Nenadović on 1 May 1804. According to K. Nenadović, Mus-aga was expelled from Šabac to Belgrade on 2 May [O.S. 20 April] 1804.

== Sources ==
- Batalaka, Lazar Arsenijević (1898). Историја српског устанка. Vol. I. Izd. Batalakinoga fonda.
- Hrabak, Bogumil (1996). "Ваљевци у почетним годинама првог српског устанка" (PDF). Гласник Историјског архива Ваљево. 30. Istorijski arhiv Valjevo.
- Ilić, Mikica (15 February 2017). "Đorđe Obradović – Ćurčija, Karađorđev ustanik iz Bosuta". M novine (791). Sremska Mitrovica: 35–41 – via Academia.edu.
- Milićević, Milić J. (2016). "Битка код Чокешине". Гласник. 50. Историјски архив Ваљево: 11–24. ISSN 0354-9143.
- Nenadović, Konstantin N. (1903) [1883]. Живот и дела великог Ђорђа Петровића Кара-Ђорђа. Vol. I (2 ed.). Belgrade: Штампа Савића и Комп. – via Archive.org.
- Novaković, Stojan (1904). Устанак на дахије 1804 [Uprising against the Dahije]. Штампано у Државној штампарији. pp. 170- – via Archive.org.
- Protić, Kosta (1893). "Ратни догађаји из првога српског устанка под Карађорђем Петровићем 1804—1813". Годишњица Николе Чупића. XIII. Državna štamparija.
