= Battle of Čokešina =

1804 battle between Serbia and the Ottoman Empire

- Part of the First Serbian Uprising
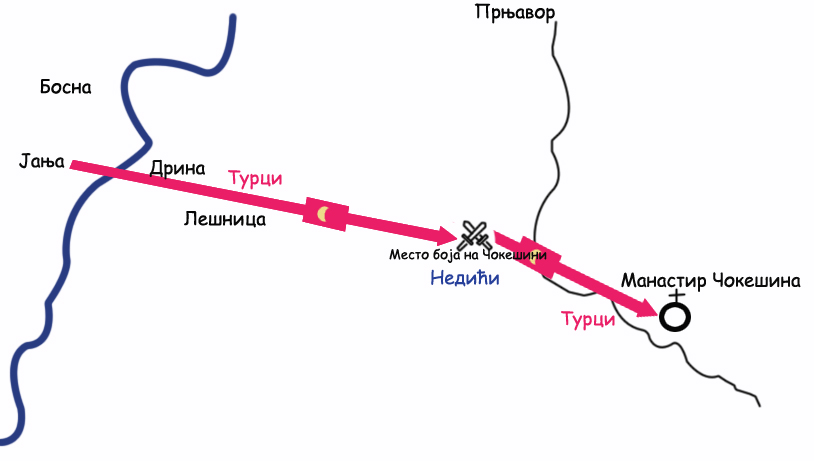
Date	28 April 1804
Location	Čokešina; Sanjak of Zvornik, Ottoman Empire (today Serbia)
Result	Dahije victory

Belligerents
Serbian rebels	Dahije; Pashalik of Zvornik

Commanders and leaders
Nedić brothers †	Mula Nožina; Ali-beg Vidajić

Strength
313	c. 1,500

Casualties and losses
303	Possibly half

The Battle of Čokešina (Serbian: Битка код Чокешине), also referred to as the "Serbian Thermopylae", was fought on Lazarus Saturday, 28 April 1804, by an outnumbered Serbian insurgent army made up of 300 hajduks under the command of the Nedić brothers against the Dahije (renegade Janissaries) who were supported by Ottoman Bosnian troops. It took place near the Monastery of Čokešina, not far from Loznica. The small Serbian force was eventually defeated after a day of fierce fighting; the death of almost all the insurgents resulted from the battle. Its aim of preventing the siege of the Ottomans at Šabac being broken by relieving Bosnian–Ottoman troops was nevertheless achieved.

== Background ==
While historiography traditionally counts two Nedić brothers, it has been proved that there were three that participated in the battle–Gligorije, Dimitrije and Damjan. The Nedić were a peasant family of five brothers (Gligorije, Mihailo, Spasoje, Dimitrije and Damjan) that exported swines to Austria and due to quarrels with Turks took to the woods as hajduks. They had prior to the uprising been part of a large hajduk band under the leadership of harambaša (bandit leader) Gligorije that was active in the mountainous areas of Cer and Vlašić. Since the beginning of the uprising the three brothers were part of vojvoda Jakov Nenadović's army and participated in the Battle of Svileuva (11 March 1804), battles around Valjevo (18 March 1804), after which they returned home where Mihailo tended to his wounds sustained at Svileuva.

On 19 March, a day following the takeover of Valjevo, Serb troops commanded by Jakov and Luka Lazarević besieged Šabac but had difficulties as they were ill-equipped with only one cannon. The defenders of the Šabac Fortress were around 300 troops under Mus-aga Fočić, the brother of Mehmed-aga Fočić, one of the four Dahije leaders. On 25 March Mus-aga sent a request for reinforcement and help from the Dahije in Belgrade. On 22 April reinforcement came from the Pashalik of Zvornik (in Bosnia), with Pasha of Zvornik Ali-beg Vidajić and kabadahija Mula Nožina crossing the Drina and arriving at Lešnica (Loznica) with thousands of troops. As they feared hajduk ambushes in the Kitog forest which was on the way to Šabac, the Ottoman Bosnian troops instead took the route towards Čokešina where they sought to fight hajduk bands and the insurgent army that temporarily assembled in the area. Hajduk harambaša Đorđe Ćurčija, the main hajduk leader in the Rađevina area, noted the troop movement and secretly entered the Ottoman Bosnian camp at Lešnica where he saw a large force that planned to break the siege at Šabac – he sent a message to Jakov Nenadović on 25 April regarding this, at a very delicate moment. Those days, Jakov Nenadović and Mus-aga Fočić began talks about handing over Šabac to the Serbs, Fočić being unaware of the coming Bosnian reinforcement. Jakov Nenadović thus strengthened guards around the town, as to not let that information through, while his nephew archpriest Matija Nenadović continued the talks. The Čokešina Monastery was decided as an assembly point of Jakov Nenadović and his 400 troops, Ćurčija, knez Mihailo Ružić from Cer and the Nedić brothers that had mustered a hajduk band.

== Prelude ==
On 27 April 1804, the leaders met by the Čokešina Monastery, where Jakov Nenadović was scolded by Đorđe Ćurčija for not having taken more troops with him. Ćurčija now saw the only way to defend themselves from the Ottoman Bosnian troops was to take the battle into the woods. Jakov Nenadović then suggested that they barricade themselves around the monastery to try to minimize the Bosnian supremacy, which Ćurčija disagreed with, upon which Jakov called him a coward and Ćurčija thus left offended with his troops (numbering 100–300) towards Cer. The Nedić brothers likewise disagreed, as to "not paint the church with blood" nor enter a battle under those circumstances. Now, Jakov Nenadović left with his troops (numbering 400), except Prnjavor knez Kuzman Vujičić who stayed with a number of his villagers. The priest of Osečina Spasoje joined the Nedić with a number of armed villagers and two monks. Mihailo Ružić who had planned to come with his troops, allegedly saw Ćurčija leave the area and thought that the assembly was called off. In the morning, Čokešina hegumen Hadži-Konstantin and hieromonk Vasilije Popović held a communion without canon. The insurgents then left the monastery and clashed with the Ottoman Bosnian troops at the nearby Džikovac hill.

== Battle ==
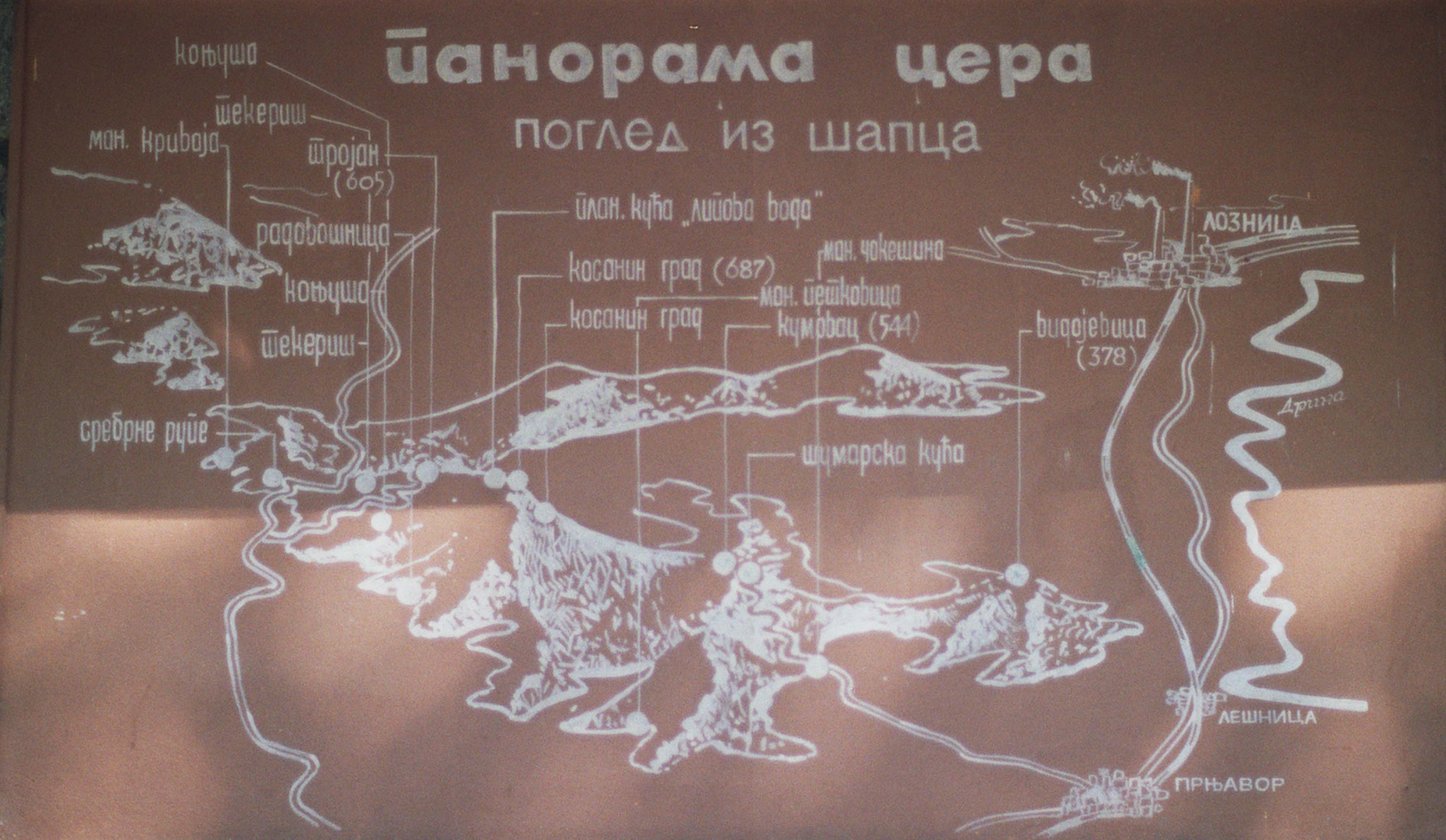
Schematic diagram of panorama of Mount Cer, showing position of Čokešina Monastery

The hajduks lay in ambush in the thick forest on the western side of the hill. Most of the information on the battle is traditionally taken from Gusle player Filip Višnjić's epic poem Boj na Čokešini. Although he was not a witness to the battle (he was blind and arrived in Serbia in 1809), he received much material for his poem as the battle was a popular topic according to newer historiography. In it, the hajduks had the upper hand in the beginning, managing to kill several named flag-bearers (bayraktar), which is taken to be true. In battles, the flag-bearers increased moral and were always targeted first. Further on, the Ottoman Bosnian numerical supremacy became clearer, which is also pointed out by Višnjić. A later source claims that the hajduks first lost the south part of their cover and then after fiercer attacks lost the north part, after which they were completely surrounded. It became a close combat fight with strangling and cutting that continued to dusk. The Ottoman Bosnian troops were reinforced during the battle from Janja. According to some accounts the Bosnian troops also had several cannons. The two Nedić brothers were wounded in the legs and fought on their knees until their deaths, with exhumation showing that Damjan had a round bullet and hole in his chest the size of a small pear (his body was transferred to the memorial graveyard in 1890). The rebels were out of ammunition and their weapons became deformed due to constant shooting. The last surviving hajduks fell by the Lipovica stream. Only two Serbs survived the battle, wounded monk Simeon and Nedić's apprentice Grujica Jevremović who survived while fetching food for the hajduks.

Although undocumented elsewhere, contemporary Vuk Karadžić blamed the defeat on the brothers' drunkenness, which has been refuted by modern historiography, as Karadžić put them in negative light as he wanted to justify Ćurčija's behaviour (he was his scribe). Contemporary records describe the brothers as "serious, sober and honest, no drunkards", however, it is still noted that this cannot be taken as a fact–most of the rebel leaders drank. One of the main causes of the defeat lies in the fact that the Ottoman Bosnian troops were numerically superior, with reinforcements throughout the day. The rebels were young men, most not older than 24 years of age. Another main cause was the shortage of ammunition, which was a common problem during the Serbian Revolution.

Jevremović went to Osečina and informed them of the battle. Čokešina hegumen Hadži-Konstantin with theologian Todor Mojić and Neda, the mother of the Nedić brothers, found eight deadly wounded at the site. Hieromonk Vasilije Popović wrote obituaries for the dead, numbering 303, listing almost every one by name, the original now held at the Military Museum at Kalemegdan. All were buried in a mass grave four days after the battle, upon the Ottoman Bosnian troops leaving the area. Jevremović saved the war flag of the Nedić brothers and gave it to Mihailo Nedić, who fought under it until his death.

Despite the defeat, the battle was instrumental in the siege of Šabac, as Vidajić and Nožina were unable to support the besieged due to casualties and instead retreated to Lešnica and then crossed the Drina. Mus-aga handed over Šabac to Matija Nenadović on 1 May 1804. After the battle, the hajduk bands subsequently merged into the insurgent army.

== Legacy ==
The battle is rather unique in military history as almost all combatants on one side were killed. Similar battles were those of the Battle of Thermopylae (480 BC), Battle of the Little Bighorn (1876) and the Battle of Kadinjača (1941), also known as the "Partisan Thermopylae". Čokešina counts as the biggest Serbian defeat in casualties by percentage in the period of 1804–1918. The heroic deaths of the participants led German historian Leopold von Ranke to call the battle the "Serbian Thermopylae" in his monograph.

On 12 April 1888 a committee for erecting a memorial and the reburial of the Nedić brothers and others buried by the Lipovački stream and a ravine to the monastery yard was established. The bodies were transferred and the monument installed on 7 October 1890, when the Nedić family also brought the Nedić flag on display and then gifted it to be held at the monastery. The monument was designed by Italian entrepreneur Nikola Tue with stone from the Petkovica Monastery quarry and was built in the yard where the eight deadly wounded died and were buried. On the anniversary in 1904 the Nedić flag was taken to the National Museum and then the Historical Museum of Serbia where it is on display today.

Three hundred Serbian heroes, two Nedić brothers Gligorije and Dimitrije born in Osečina in the district of Valjevo. Shining monuments are nothing in comparison to the heroism of those glorious Nedićes. Let their death serve before the Serbian nation for their eternal honour. Let everyone, like them pay their dues to their Homeland. For if it had not been for their death. If they had not perished for the Serbian nation, the Serb would still have been slaves to the Ottoman force in the Cer mount region. — One of the inscriptions on the monument.

Another monument to the Nedić brothers was installed in May 2008. Several streets, in Osečina, Valjevo and Belgrade bear the name of the Nedić brothers, as well as a school in Osečina. A novel surrounding the Nedić brothers was written by Dragoslav Nikolić and published in 2004.

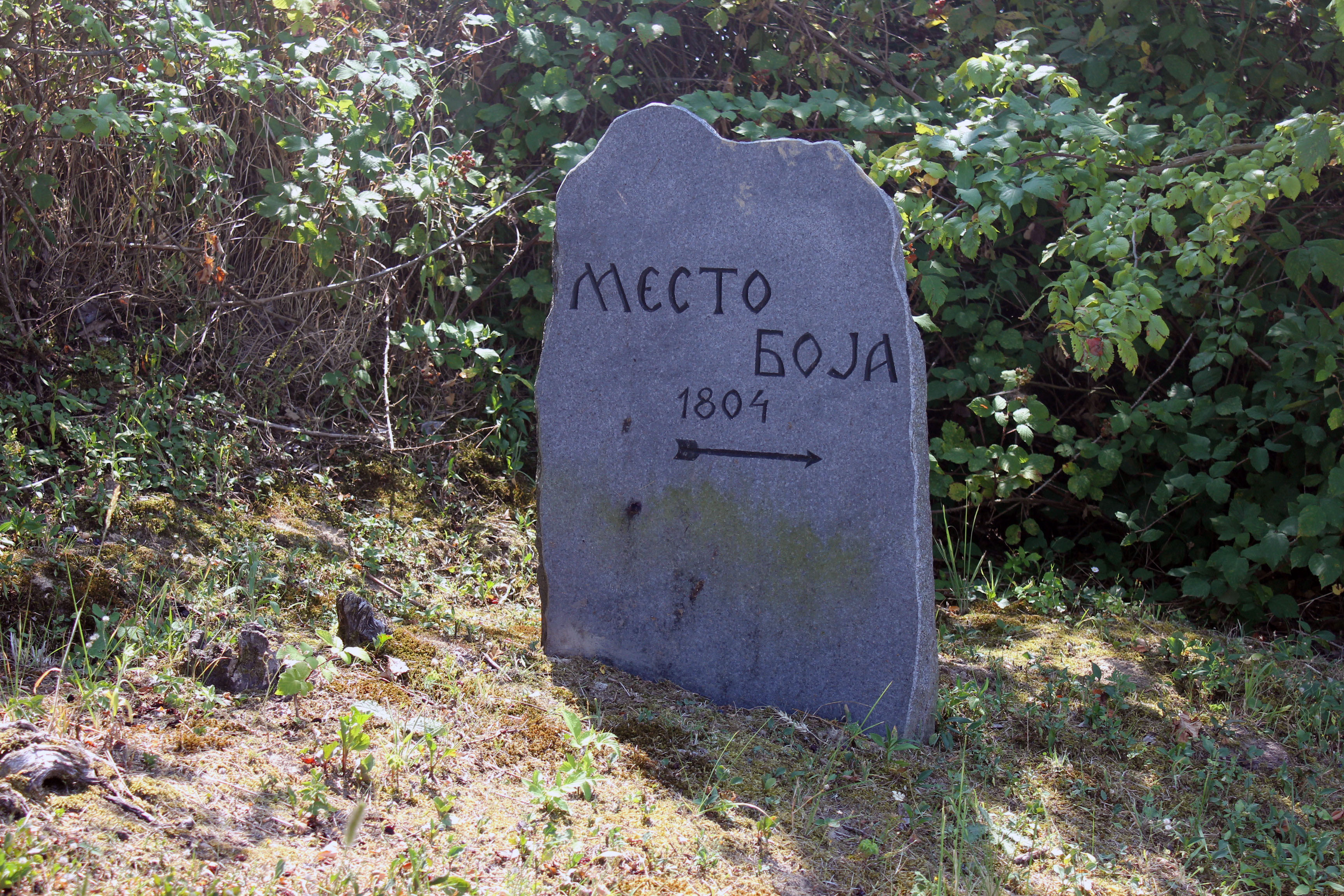
Waypoint to the site of the battle

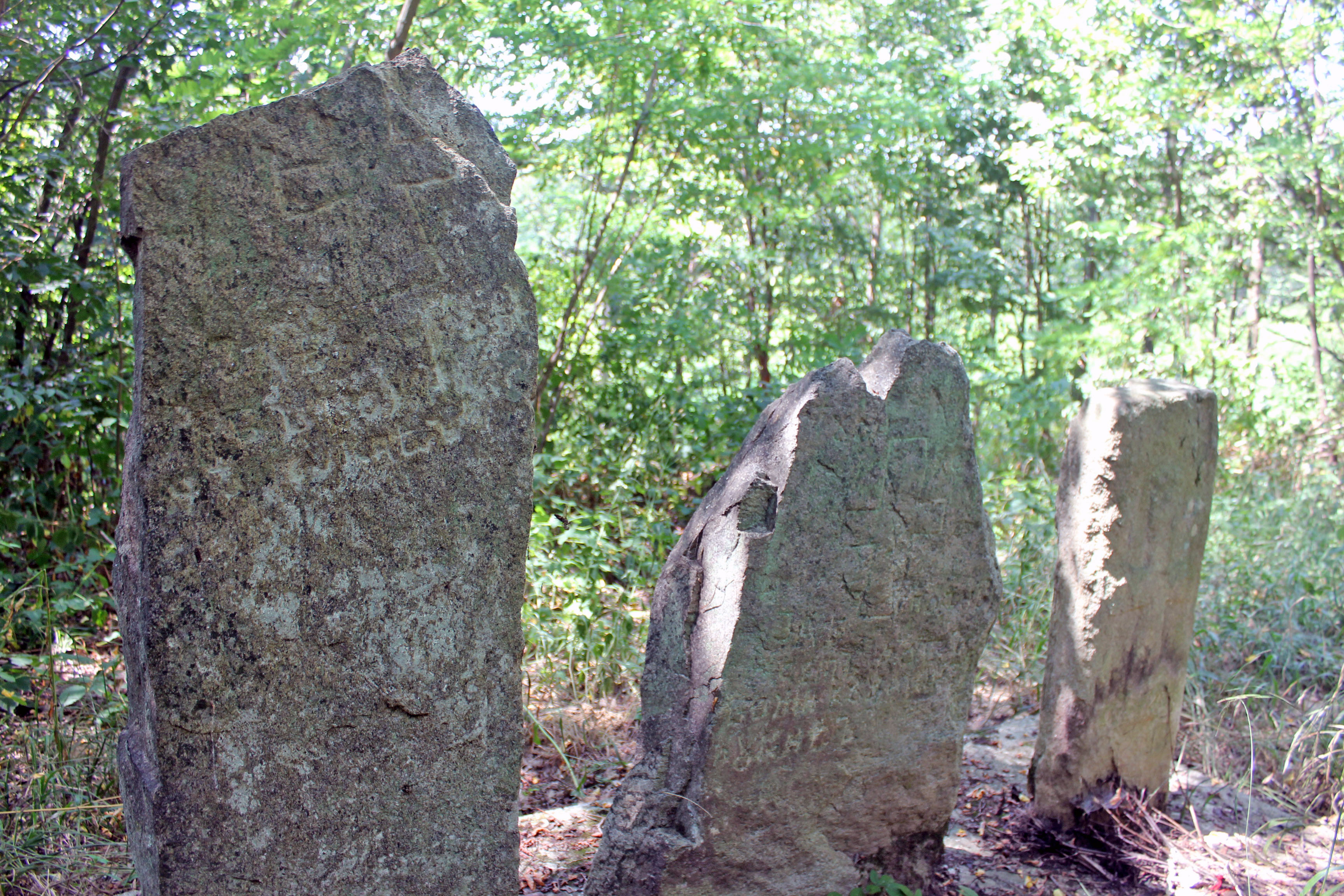
Gravestones

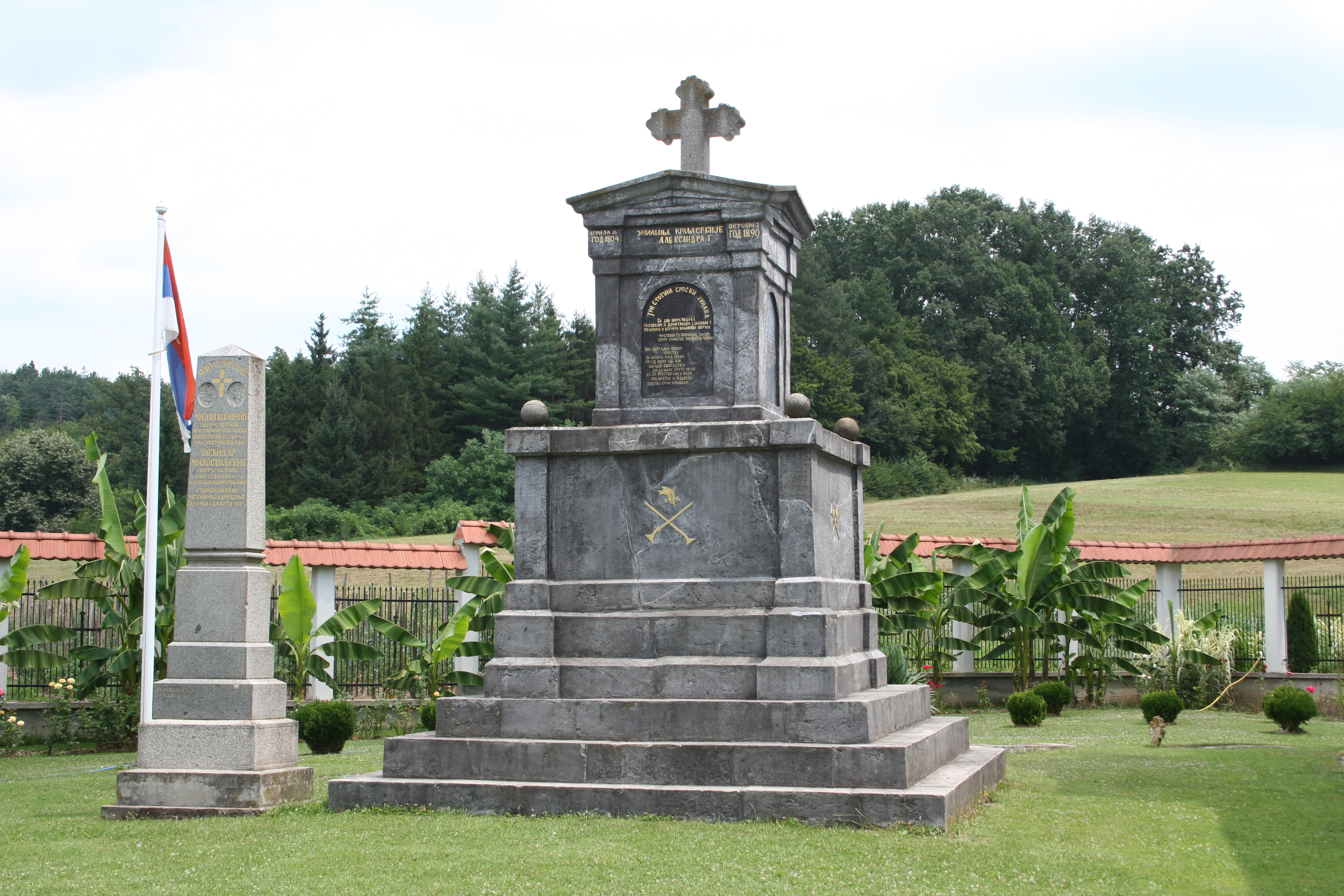
Monument to the fallen

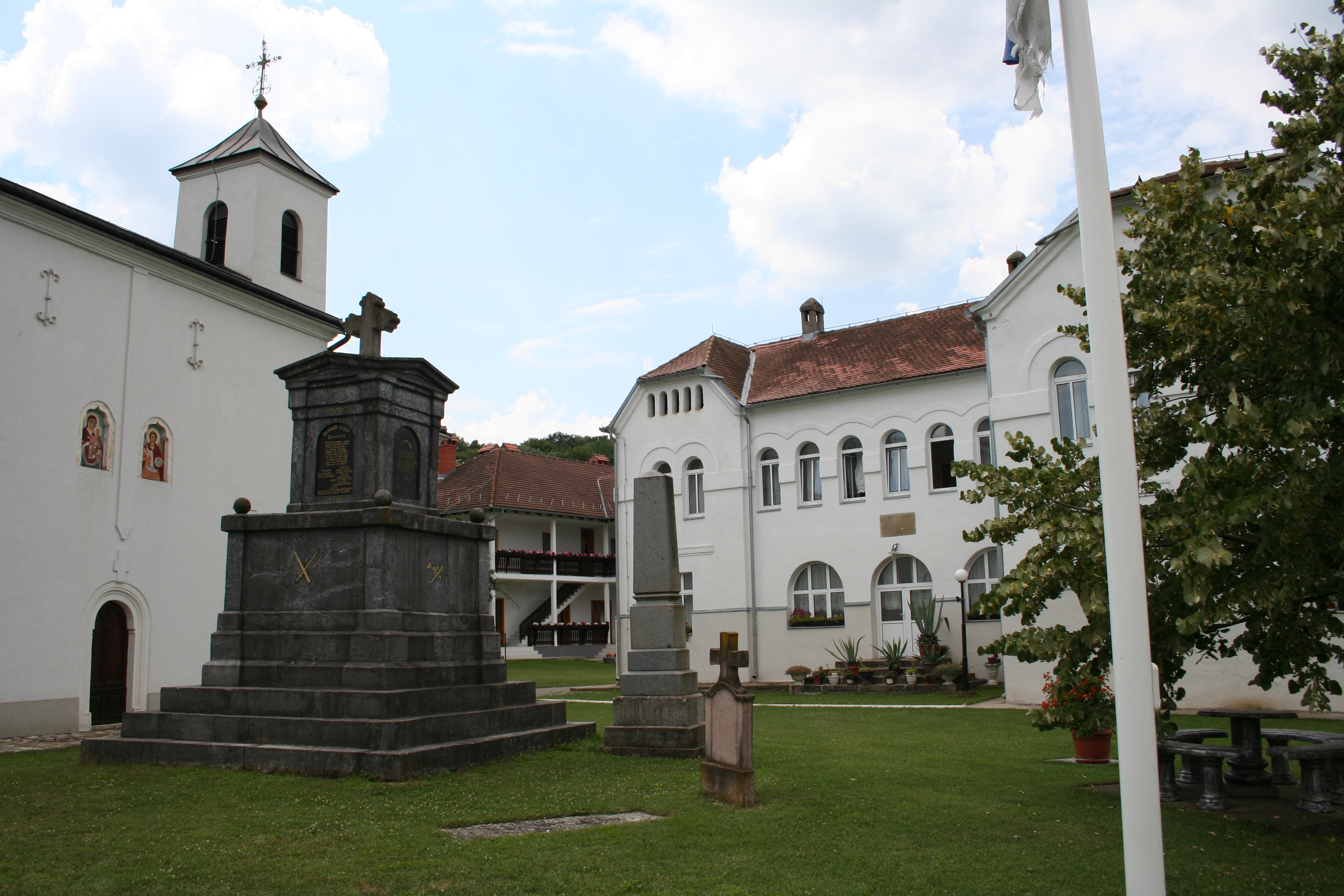
View of the Monastery and monument

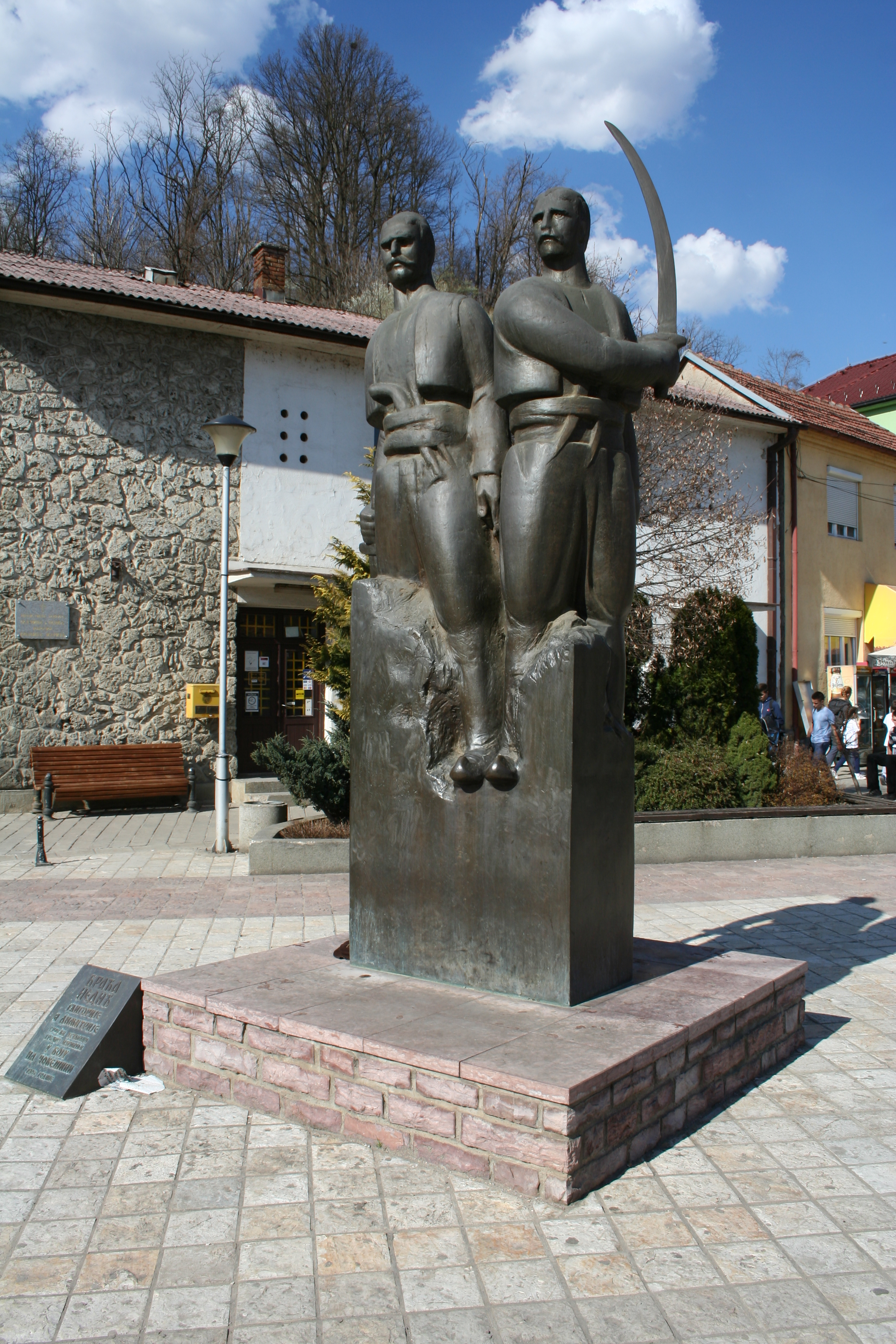
Monument to the Nedić brothers in Osečina

== See also ==
- Timeline of the Serbian Revolution

== Sources ==
- Marković, Anita (2024). "Спомен-обележја Првог српског устанка и њихова улога у изградњи националног и династичког идентитета (1842–1903)" (PDF). Saopštenja. LV.
- Milićević, Milić J. (2016). "Битка код Чокешине". Гласник. 50. Историјски архив Ваљево: 11–24. ISSN 0354-9143.
