= Eparchy of Šabac =

Diocese of the Serbian Orthodox Church

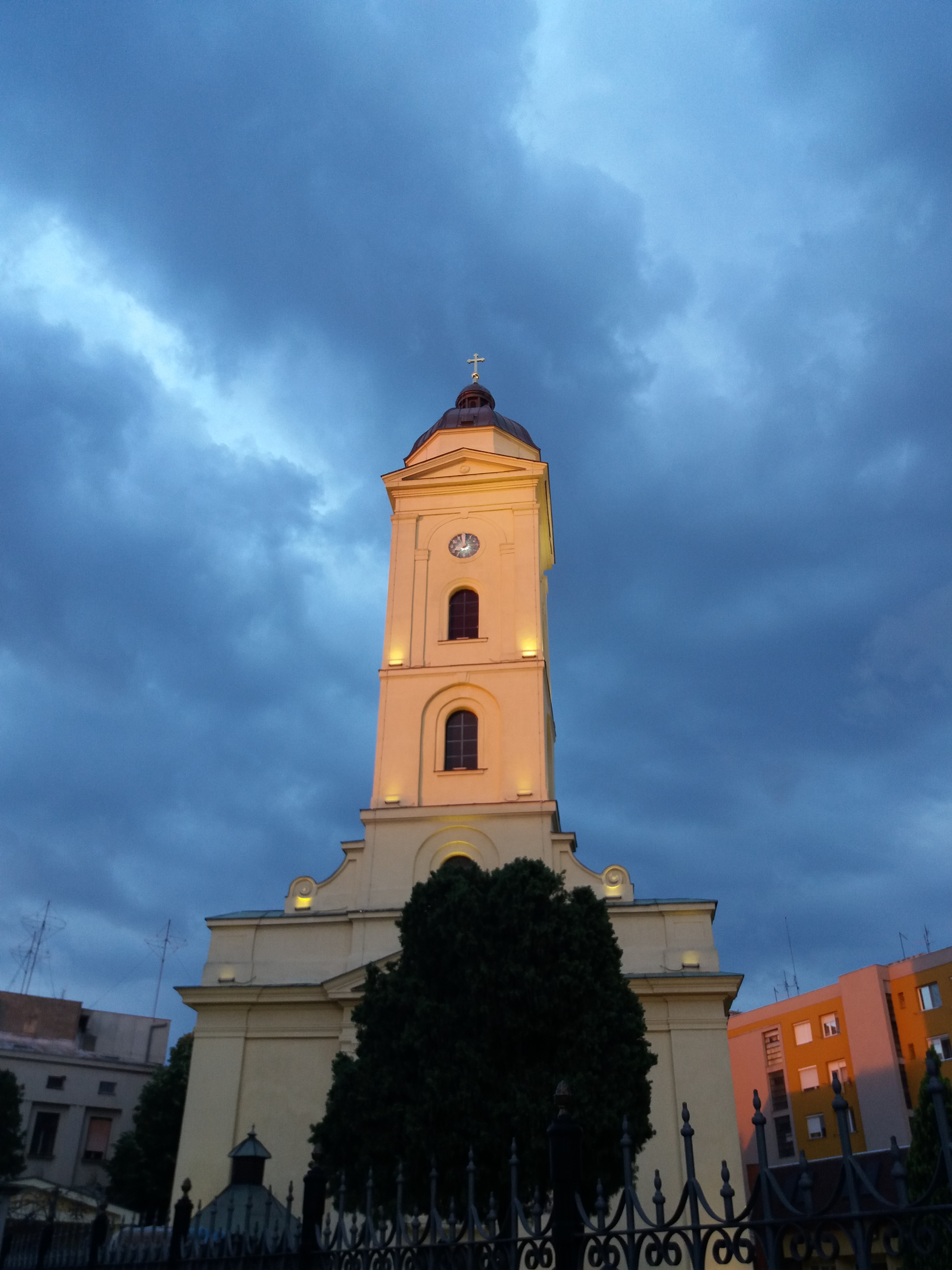
- Saints Peter and Paul Cathedral, Šabac

Location
- Territory: Mačva District
- Headquarters: Šabac, Serbia

Information
- Denomination: Eastern Orthodox
- Sui iuris church: Serbian Orthodox Church
- Established: 2006
- Cathedral: Saints Peter and Paul Cathedral, Šabac
- Language: Church Slavonic, Serbian

Current leadership
- Bishop: Jerotej Petrović

Map

Website
- Eparchy of Šabac

The Eparchy of Šabac (Serbian: Епархија шабачка, romanized: Eparhija šabačka) is a diocese (eparchy) of the Serbian Orthodox Church, covering Mačva District in western Serbia.

The episcopal see is located at the Saints Peter and Paul Cathedral, Šabac. Its headquarters and bishop's residence are also in Šabac.

== History ==
In the 18th century, the area was part of the Eparchy of Valjevo. In the end of that century, the seat of the eparchy was moved from Valjevo to Šabac. In 1831, the large Eparchy of Valjevo was divided into 3 separate eparchies: the Eparchy of Valjevo (which was renamed to the Eparchy of Šabac), the Eparchy of Užice, and the Eparchy of Zvornik. For a short period of time (from 1886 to 1898), the Eparchy of Šabac was abolished and was included into the Metropolitanate of Belgrade. In 1947, the eparchy was renamed to Eparchy of Šabac and Valjevo and its seat was in Valjevo. In 2006, the Eparchy of Šabac and Valjevo was divided into two separate eparchies: the Eparchy of Šabac and the Eparchy of Valjevo.

== List of bishops ==
- Lavrentije Trifunović (2006–2022)
- Jerotej Petrović (2022–present)

== Notable monasteries ==
- Tronoša
- Kaona
- Čokešina
- Soko

== Gallery ==
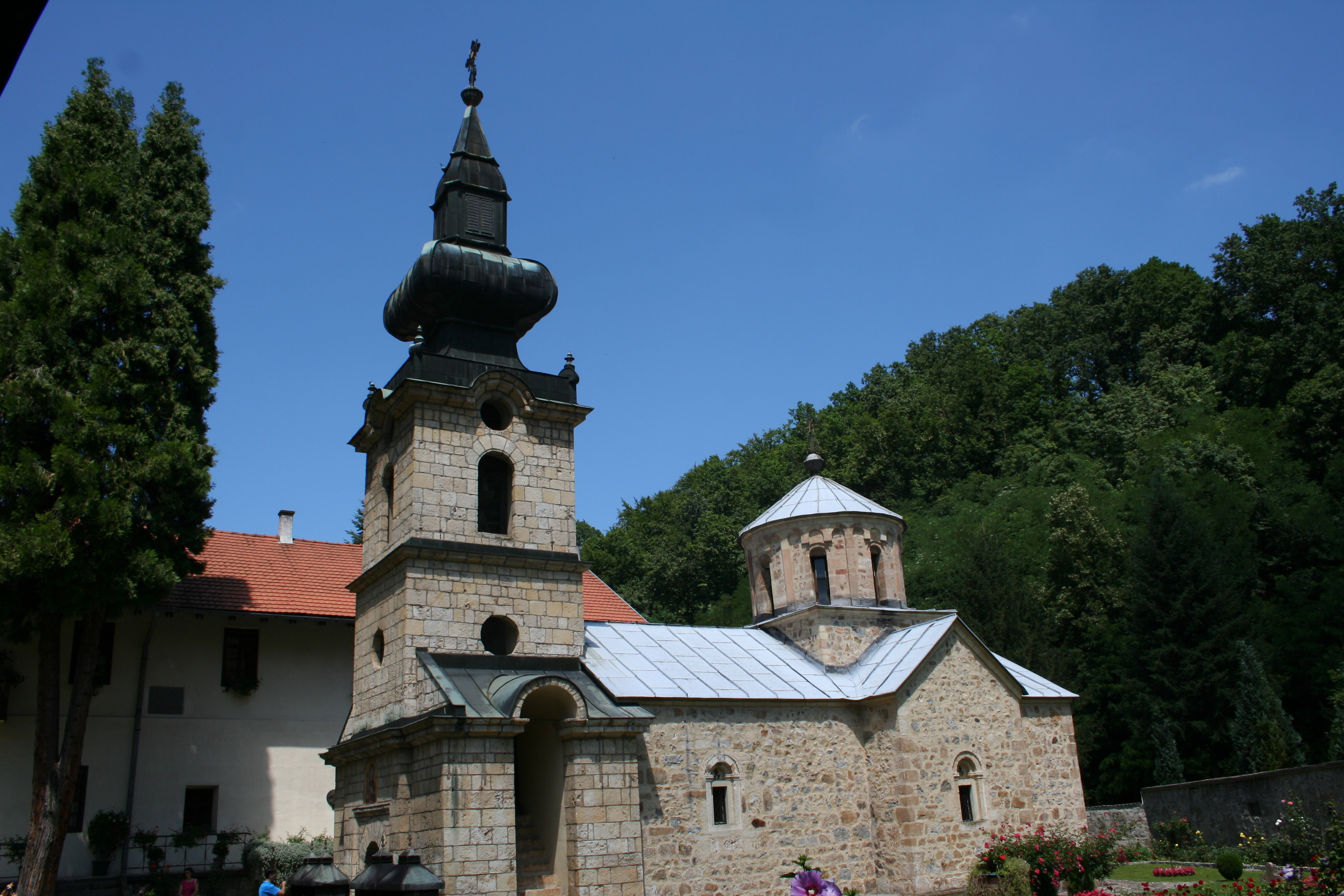
Tronoša Monastery

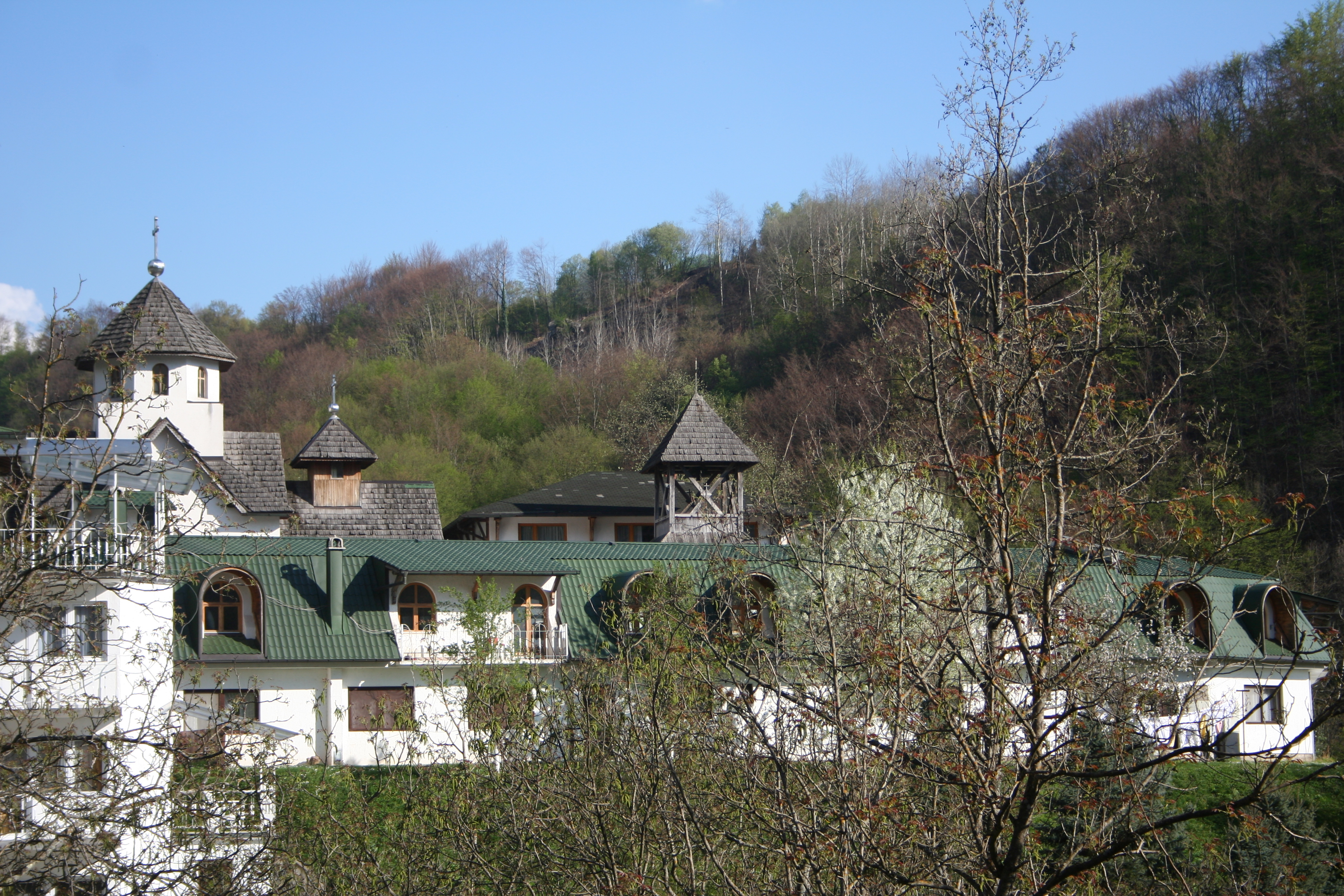
Soko Monastery

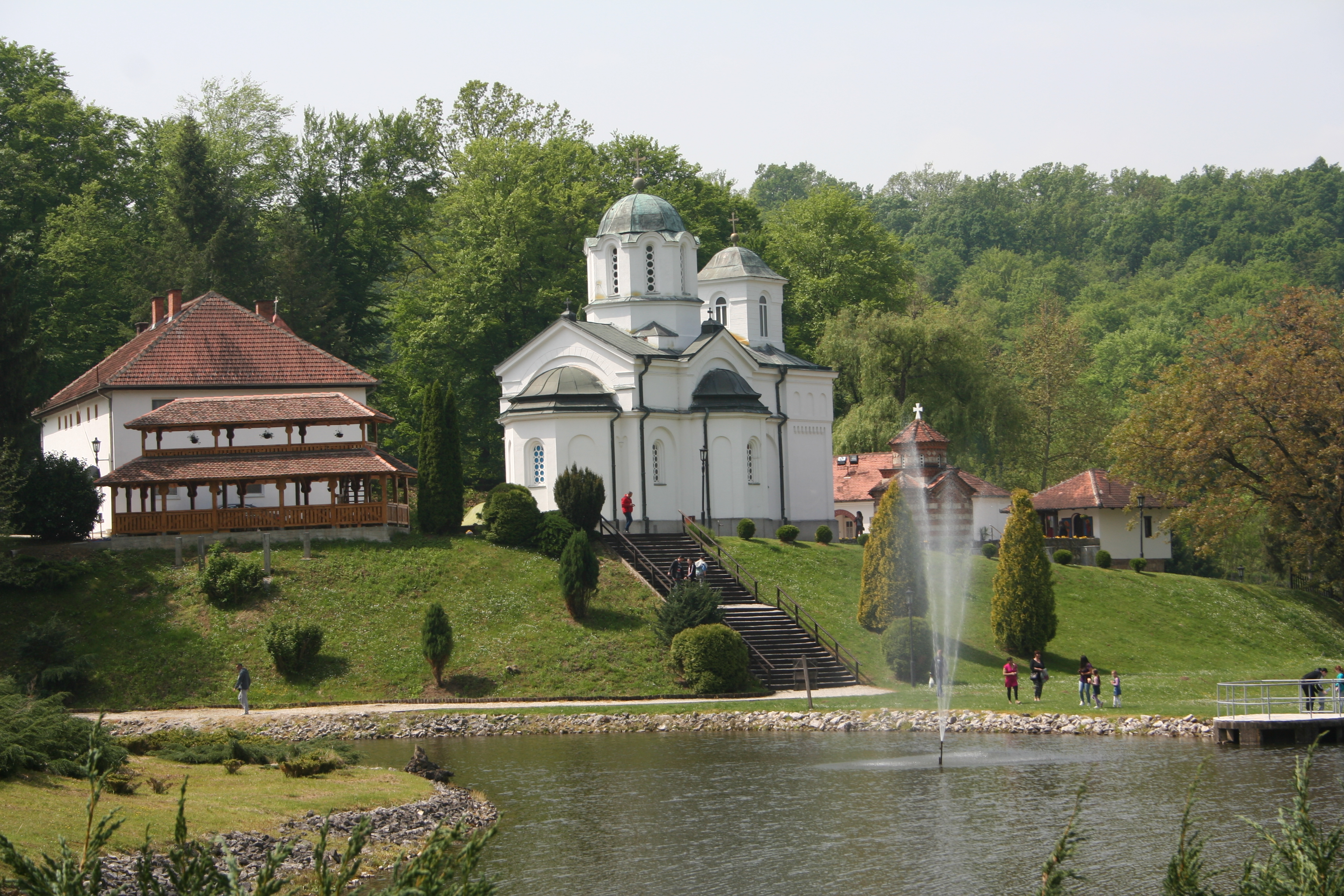
Kaona Monastery

== See also ==
- Eparchies and metropolitanates of the Serbian Orthodox Church

== Sources ==
- Вуковић, Сава (1996). Српски јерарси од деветог до двадесетог века (Serbian Hierarchs from the 9th to the 20th Century). Евро, Унирекс, Каленић.
- Ćirković, Sima (2004). The Serbs. Malden: Blackwell Publishing.
