= Kaona Monastery =

Monastery in Serbia

Coordinates: 44.5297°N 19.7046°E

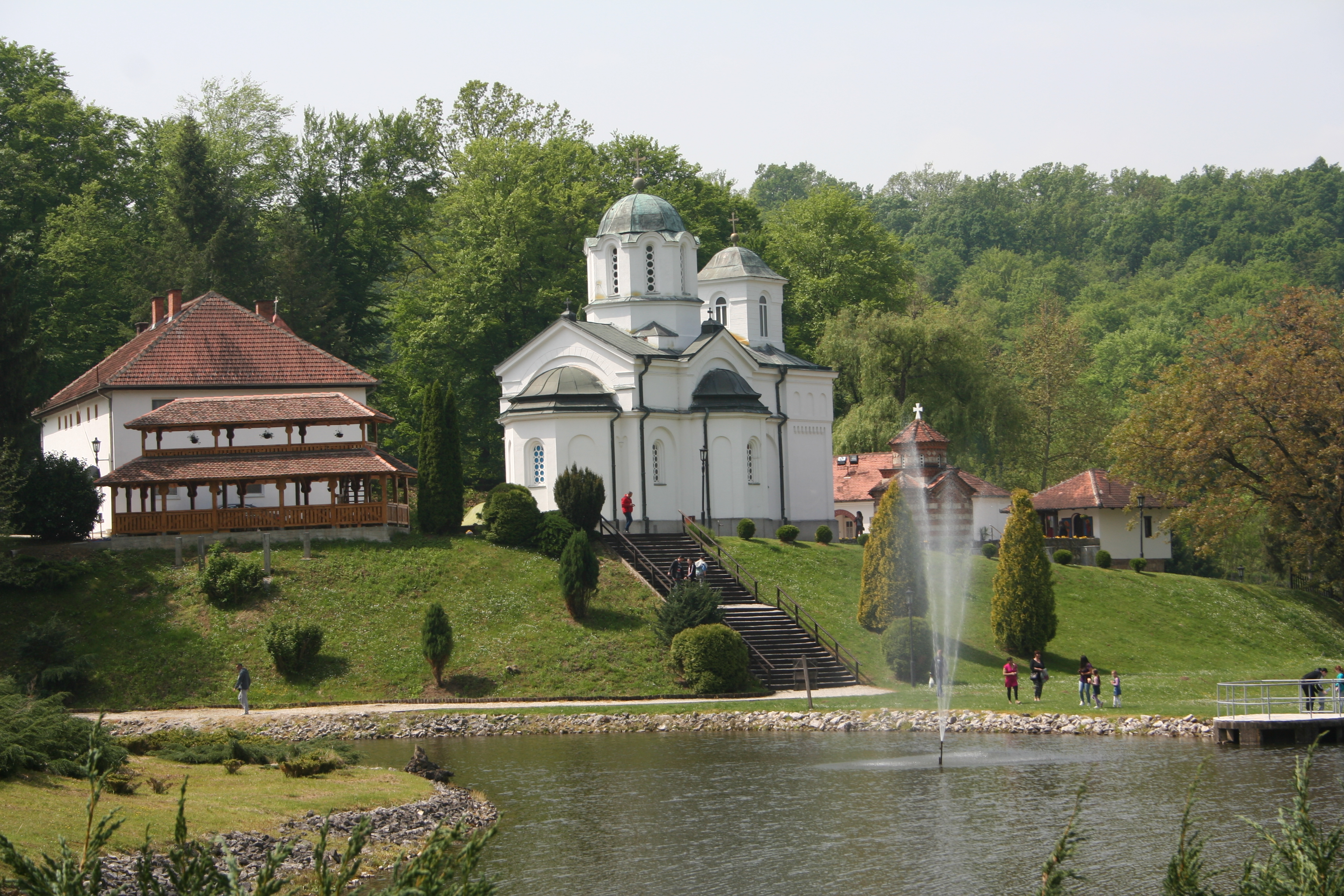
- Kaona Monastery
- Denomination: Serbian Orthodox

Architecture
- Years built: 11th century

The Kaona Monastery (Serbian Cyrillic: Манастир Каона) is a Serbian Orthodox monastery in the Eparchy of Šabac. It was founded in the 14th century and is considered a cultural property and a cultural monument. The monastery is dedicated to the Holy Archangel Michael.

== History ==
The monastery of Kaona played a leading role in the First Serbian Uprising, as the monks took part in the combat. Afterwards, the monastery’s residence was turned into a hospital. Since the church housed ammunition for the western army, worship was performed in one room of the konak, which was turned into a chapel and dedicated to the Assumption of the Holy Mother of God.

The latest structure was built in 1892 in the Byzantine style on the stone foundations of the old church and cemetery.

== Bell tower ==
The monastery bell tower is about twenty meters from the present church. Every morning and evening, three bells of different sizes call the worshipers to prayer.

== Archive fire ==
In World War I, the church archive was set on fire and two bells were taken away. After World War II, in which the monastery was a kind of shelter, the church was in poor condition, and an agrarian reform program confiscated 120 hectares of monastery land.

== Renovation ==
The great renovation of this shrine began with the appointment of Teofilo as the head of the monastery in 1962. He was also the leader of the worship movement in the diocese of Sabac-Valjevo.

== Jubilees ==
On August 29, 1992, two jubilees were celebrated: the 600th anniversary of the monastery and the centenary of the present monastery church. The Holy Hierarch's Liturgy was performed by Serbian Patriarch Pavle with two Hierarchs.

The abbot Milutin, who in 2003 played a major role in the renovation and arrangement of the monastery, became Bishop of Valjevo and Bishop of Australia and New Zealand in 2006 (when there was a division of diocese of Sabac-Valjevo to diocese of Sabac and diocese of Valjevo). After Milutin Knezevic, the head of the monastery was Arsenije Cvetkovic (1953-2013), who died in October 2013.

The monastery keeps relics of the Venerable Mother Paraskeva.

== Folklore ==
According to folklore, this monastery was a sacred endowment of Ikonija, sister of Miloš Obilić.

== Gallery ==
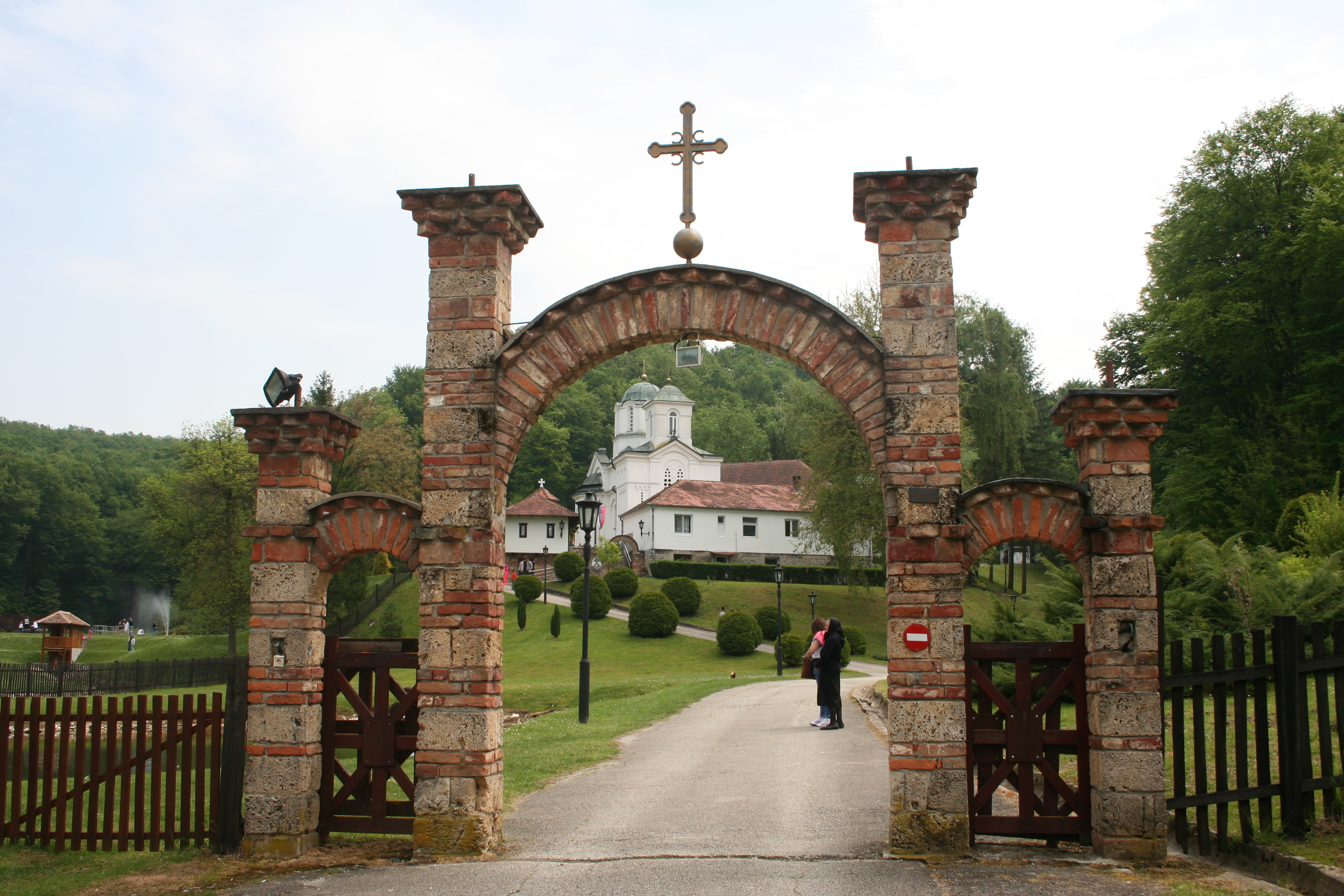

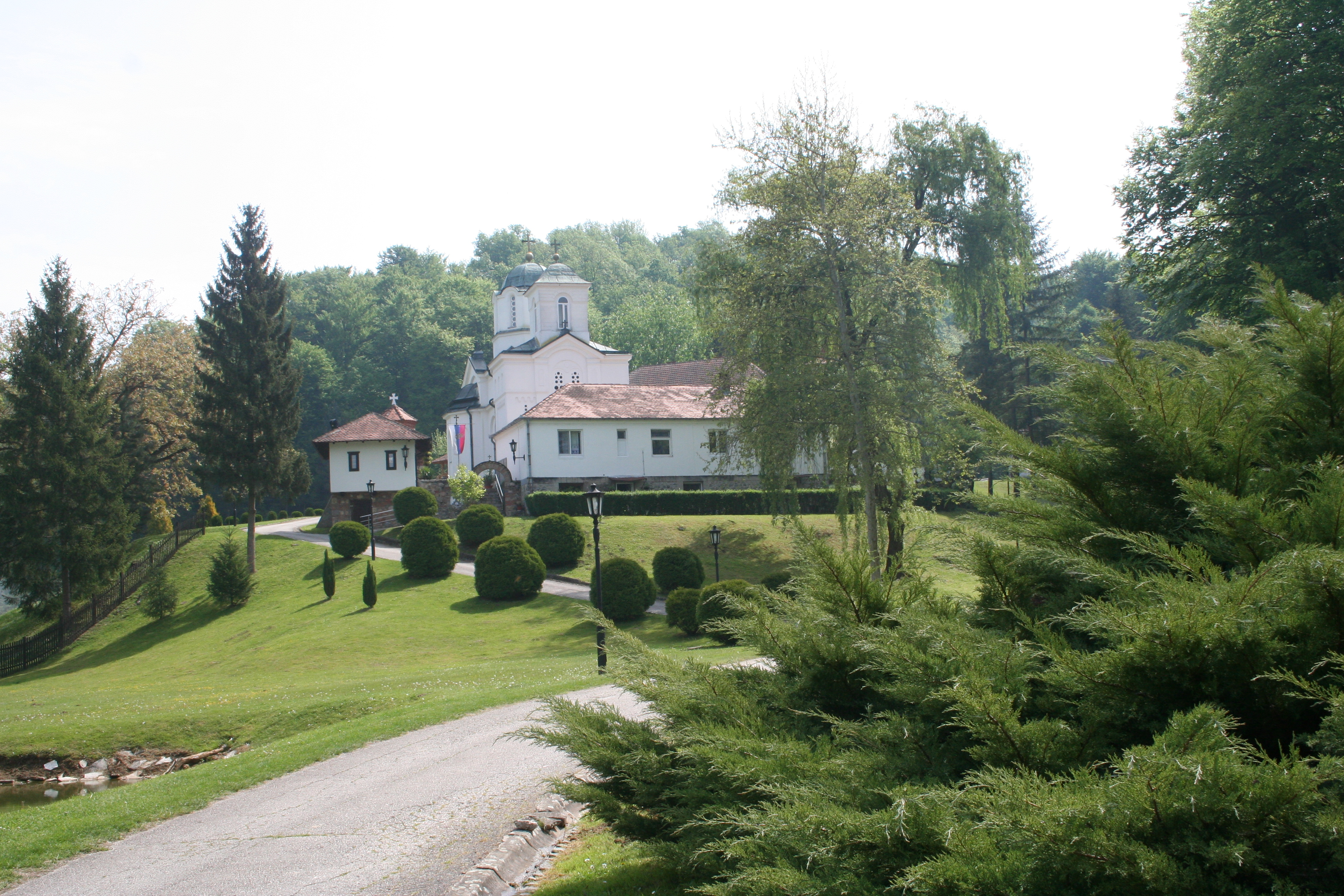

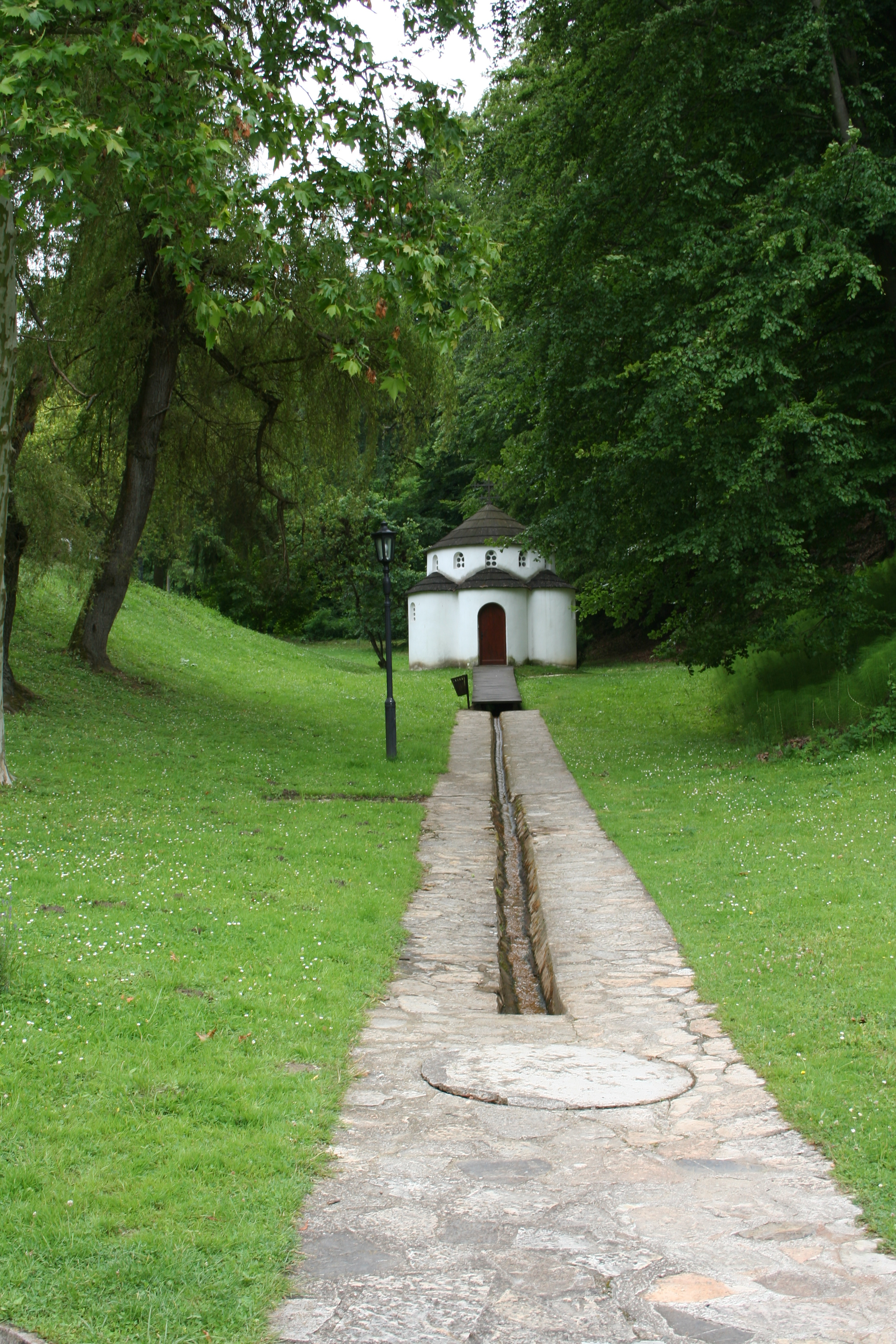

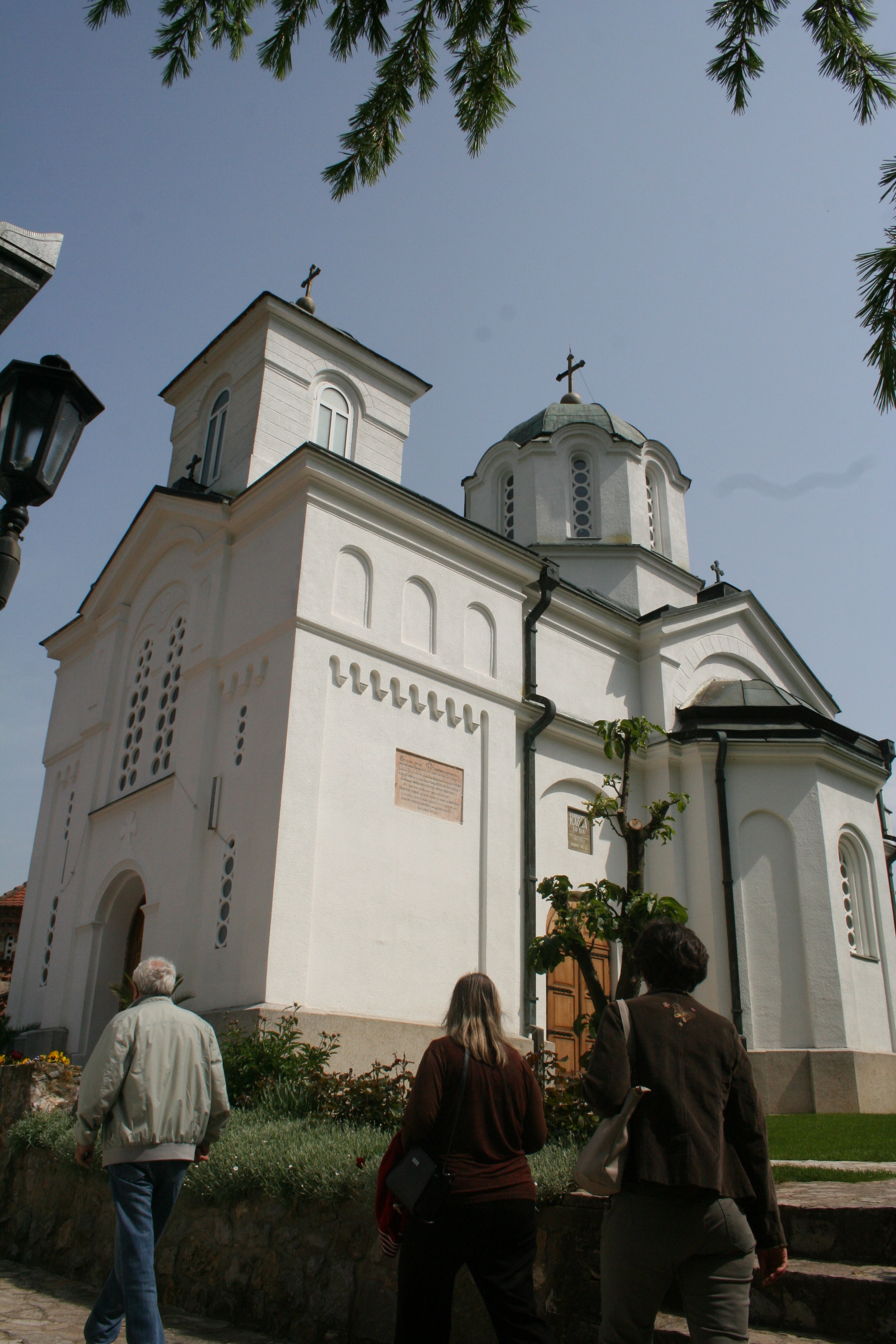

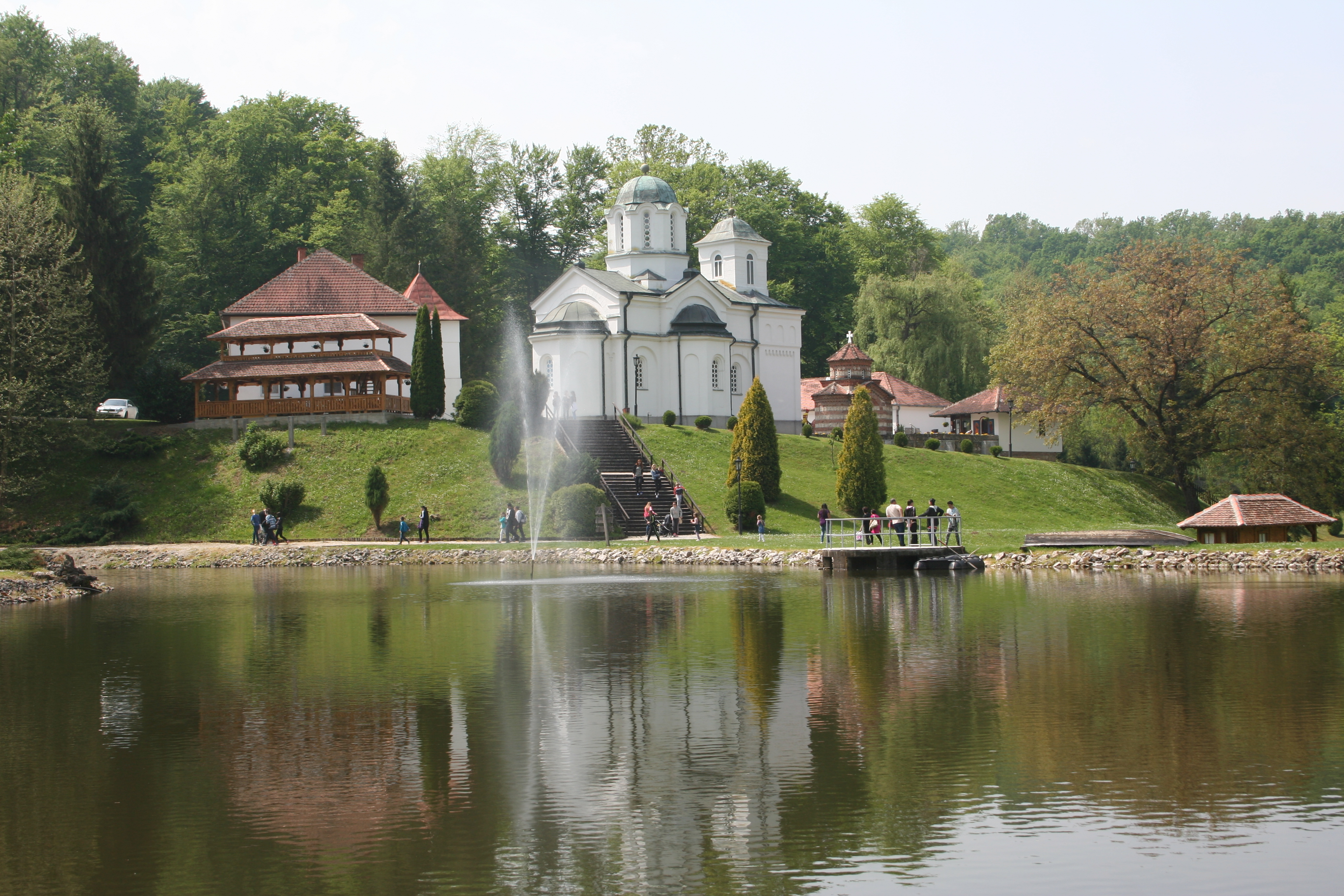

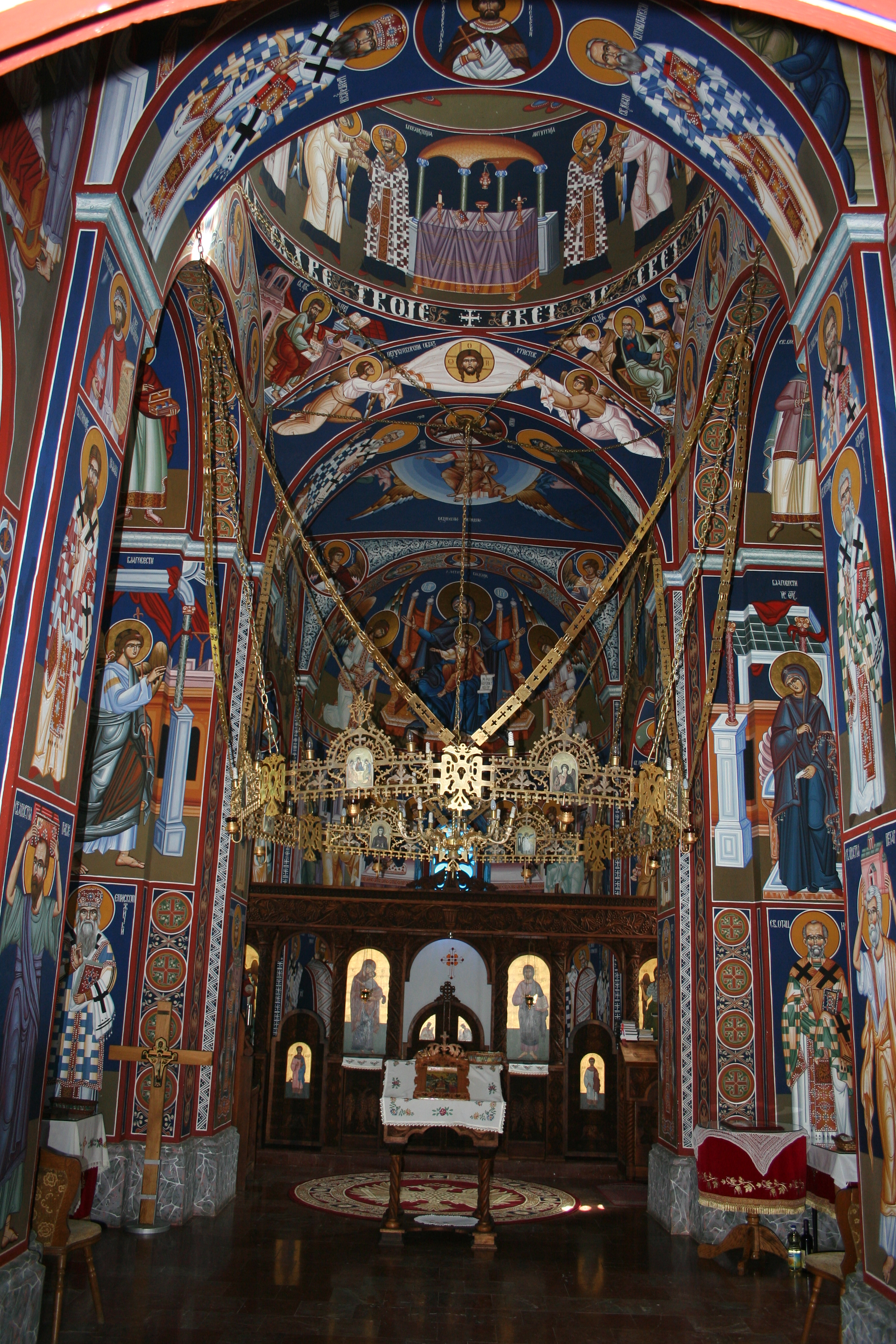

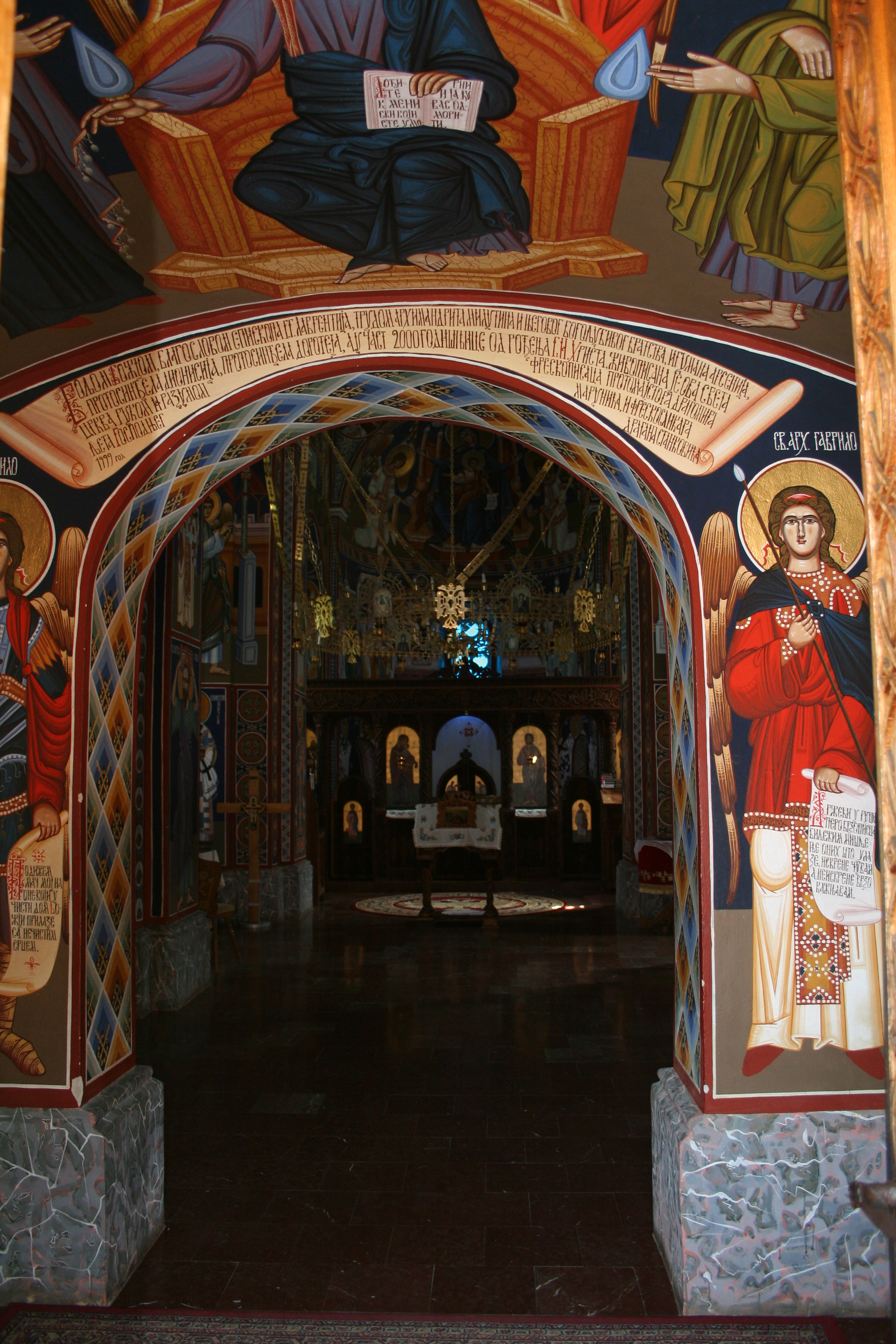

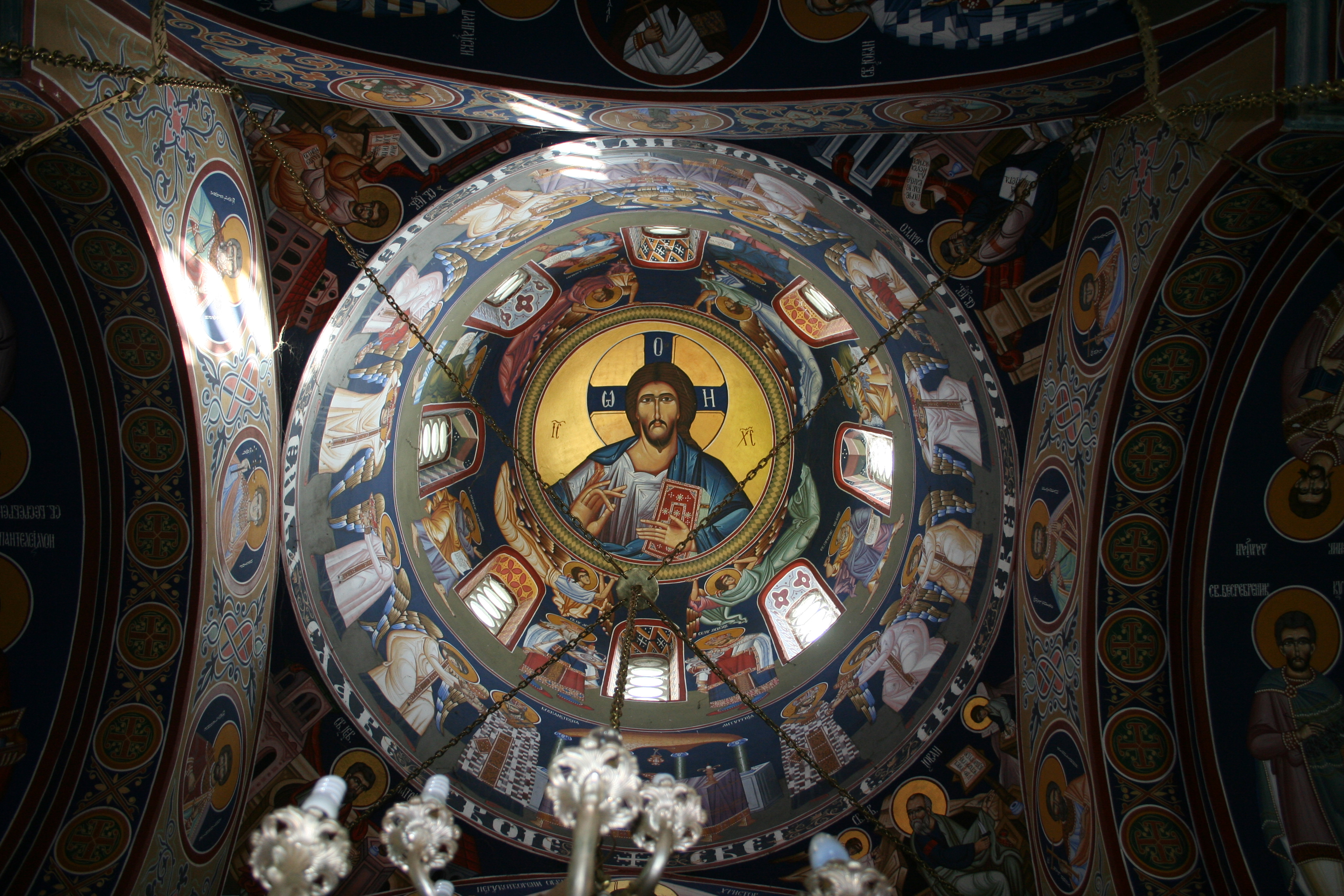

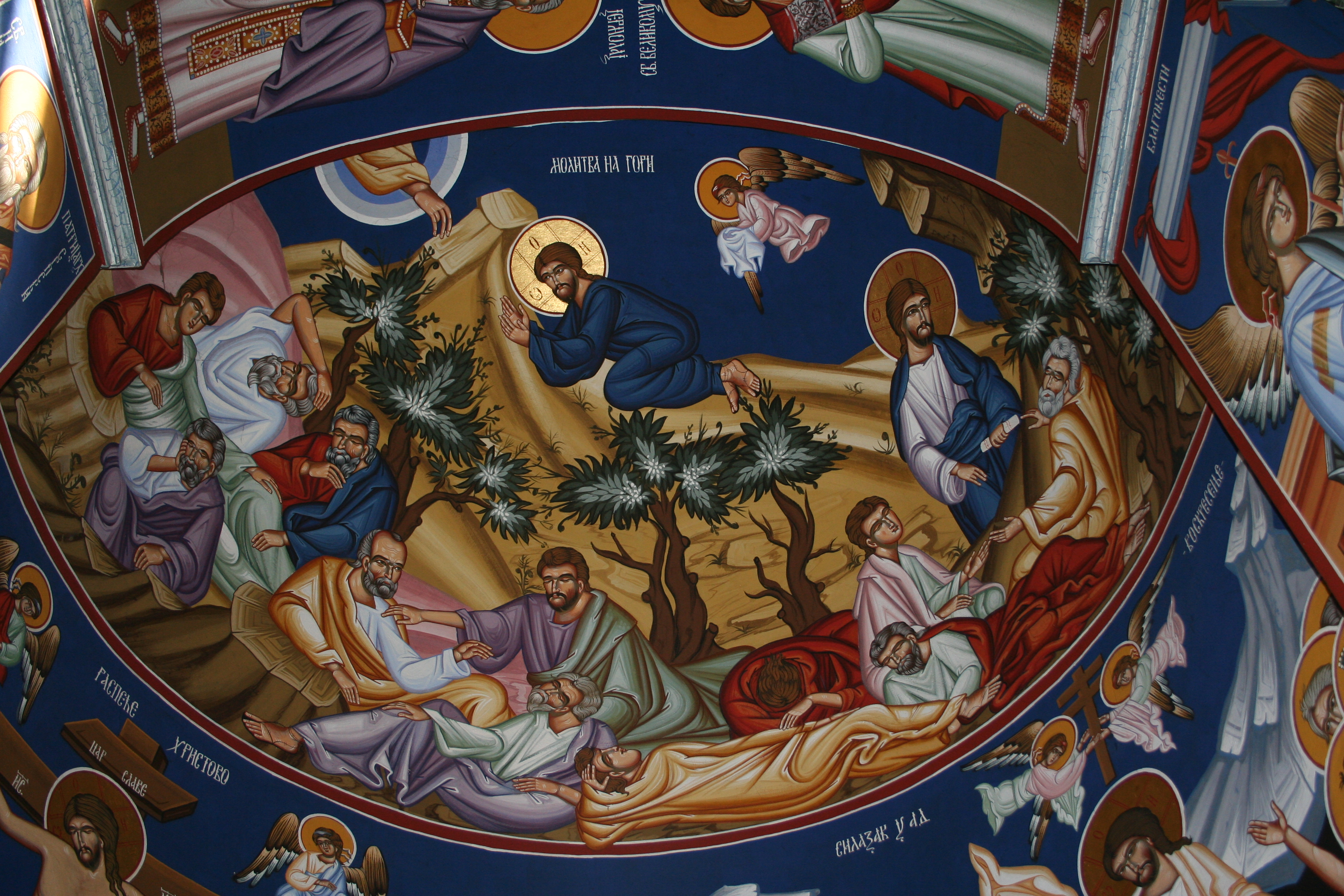

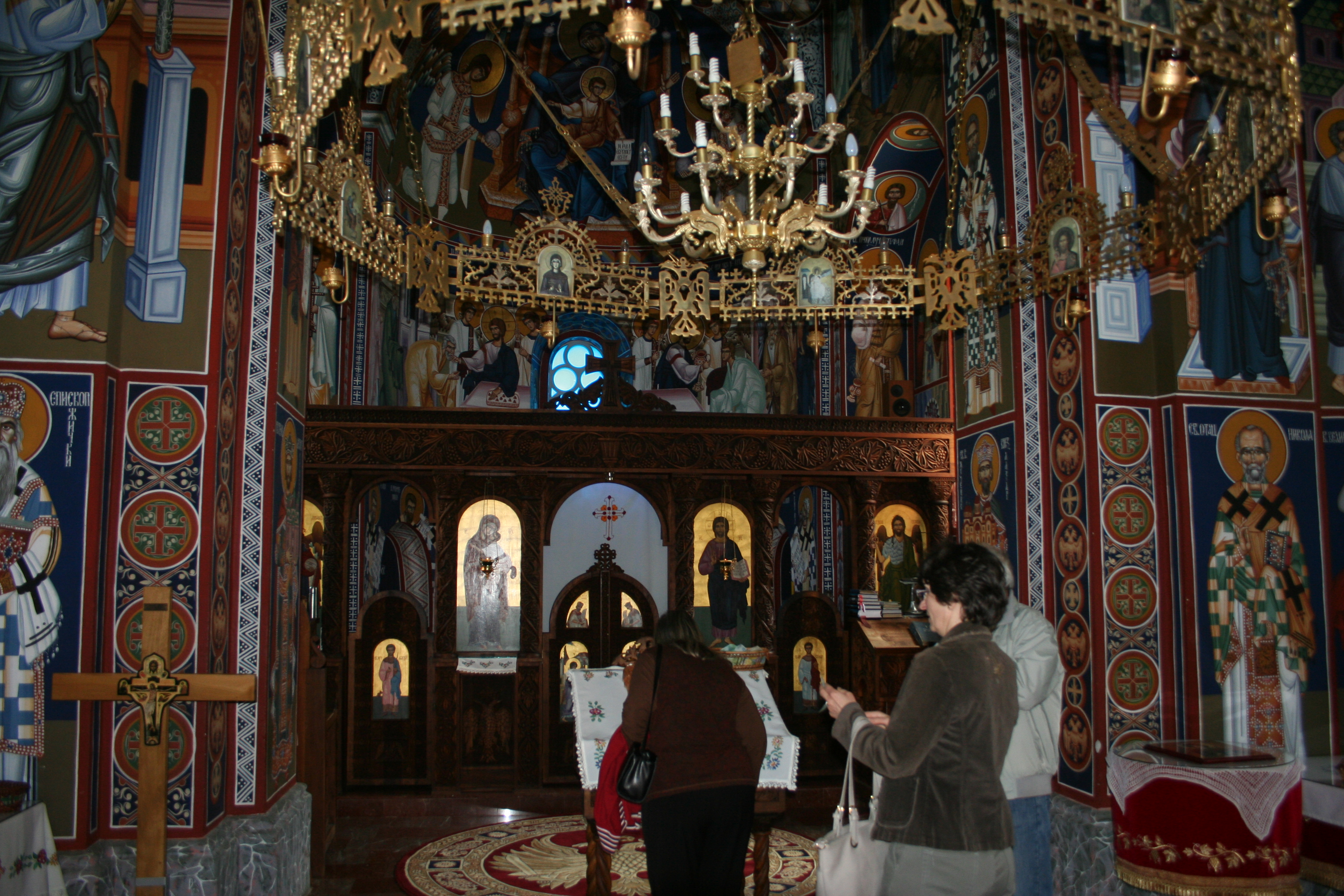

== See also ==
- List of Serbian Orthodox monasteries

== Literature ==
- Завод за заштиту споменика Ваљево: "Споменичко наслеђе Колубарског и Мачванског Округа" . COBISS 131307532
