= Nedić brothers =

Serbian hero (1772–1804)

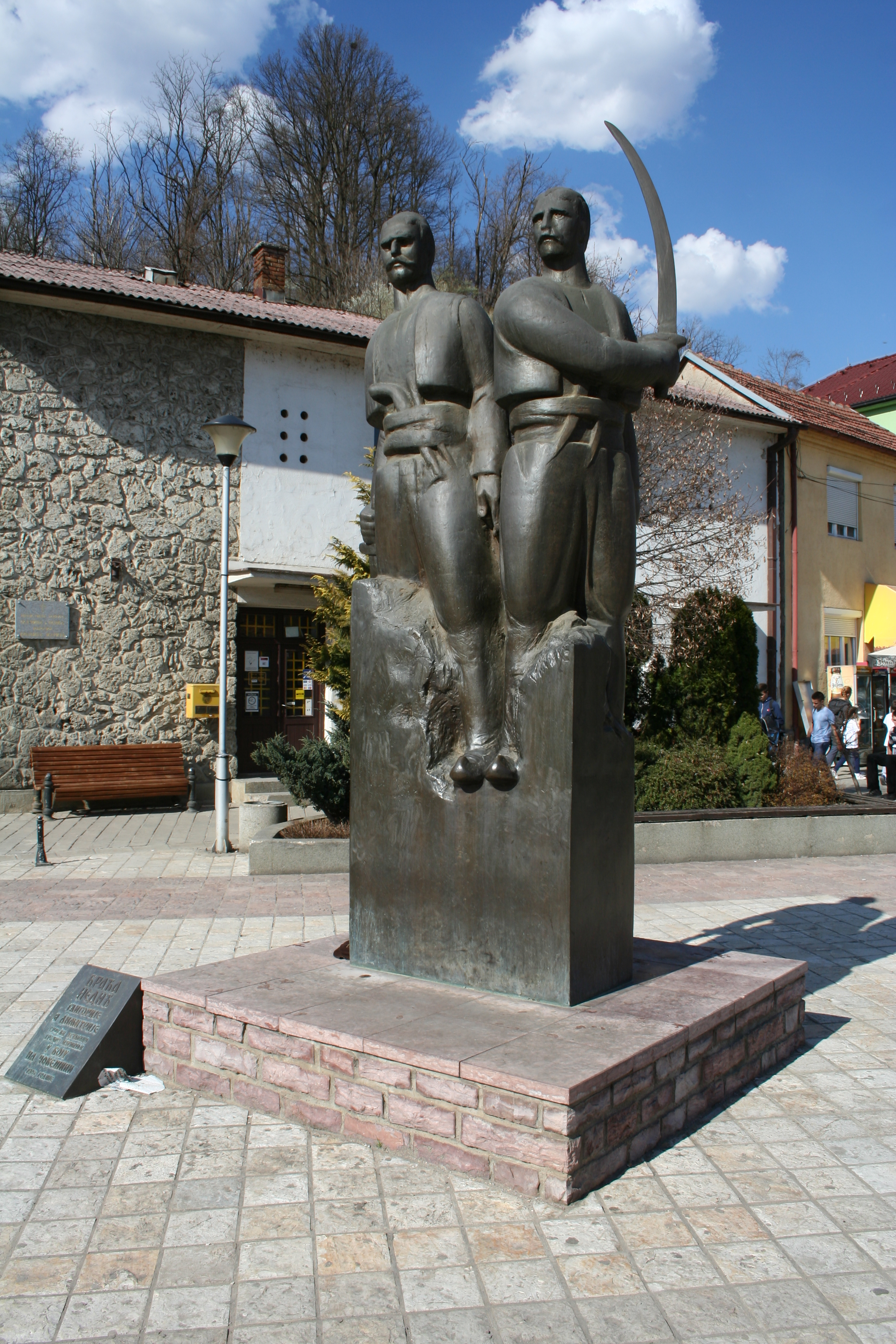
Monument to the Nedić brothers in Osečina.

The Nedić brothers were five Serbian hajduk brothers from Osečina in western Serbia active during the First Serbian Uprising (1804–13). Three of the brothers, Gligorije, Dimitrije and Damjan, fell at the Battle of Čokešina (28 April 1804) while fighting against a numerically superior army of Dahije and Ottoman Bosnian troops. The Nedić brothers are regarded heroes.

While historiography traditionally counts two Nedić brothers, it has been proved that there were three that participated in the battle–Gligorije, Dimitrije and Damjan. The Nedić were a peasant family of five brothers (Gligorije, Mihailo, Spasoje, Dimitrije and Damjan) that exported swines to Austria and due to quarrels with Turks took to the woods as hajduks. They had prior to the uprising been part of a large hajduk band under the leadership of harambaša (bandit leader) Gligorije that was active in the mountainous areas of Cer and Vlašić. Since the beginning of the uprising the three brothers were part of vojvoda Jakov Nenadović's army and participated in the Battle of Svileuva (11 March 1804), battles around Valjevo (18 March 1804), after which they returned home where Mihailo tended to his wounds sustained at Svileuva. The Čokešina Monastery was decided as an assembly point of Jakov Nenadović, Ćurčija, knez Mihailo Ružić from Cer and the Nedić brothers that had mustered a hajduk band. On 27 April 1804, the leaders met by the Čokešina Monastery, where Jakov Nenadović quarreled with Ćurčija and the Nedić brothers regarding strategy. The Nedić brothers stayed while the other leaders left the monastery. They then clashed with numerically superior Ottoman Bosnian troops at a nearby hill, in the Battle of Čokešina, being decimated.

Mihailo Nedić was killed in another battle in 1809.

The bodies the three Nedić brothers and their comrades were transferred and a monument installed on 7 October 1890, when the Nedić family also brought the Nedić flag on display and then gifted it to be held at the monastery. On the anniversary in 1904 the Nedić flag was taken to the National Museum and then the Historical Museum of Serbia where it is on display today. Another monument to the Nedić brothers was installed in May 2008. Several streets, in Osečina, Valjevo and Belgrade bear the name of the Nedić brothers, as well as a school in Osečina. A novel surrounding the Nedić brothers was written by Dragoslav Nikolić and published in 2004.

== Sources ==
- Marković, Anita (2024). "Спомен-обележја Првог српског устанка и њихова улога у изградњи националног и династичког идентитета (1842–1903)" (PDF). Saopštenja. LV.
- Milićević, Milić J. (2016). "Битка код Чокешине". Гласник. 50. Историјски архив Ваљево: 11–24. ISSN 0354-9143.
