= Čokešina =

Čokešina Чокешина (Serbian)
- Village (Selo)
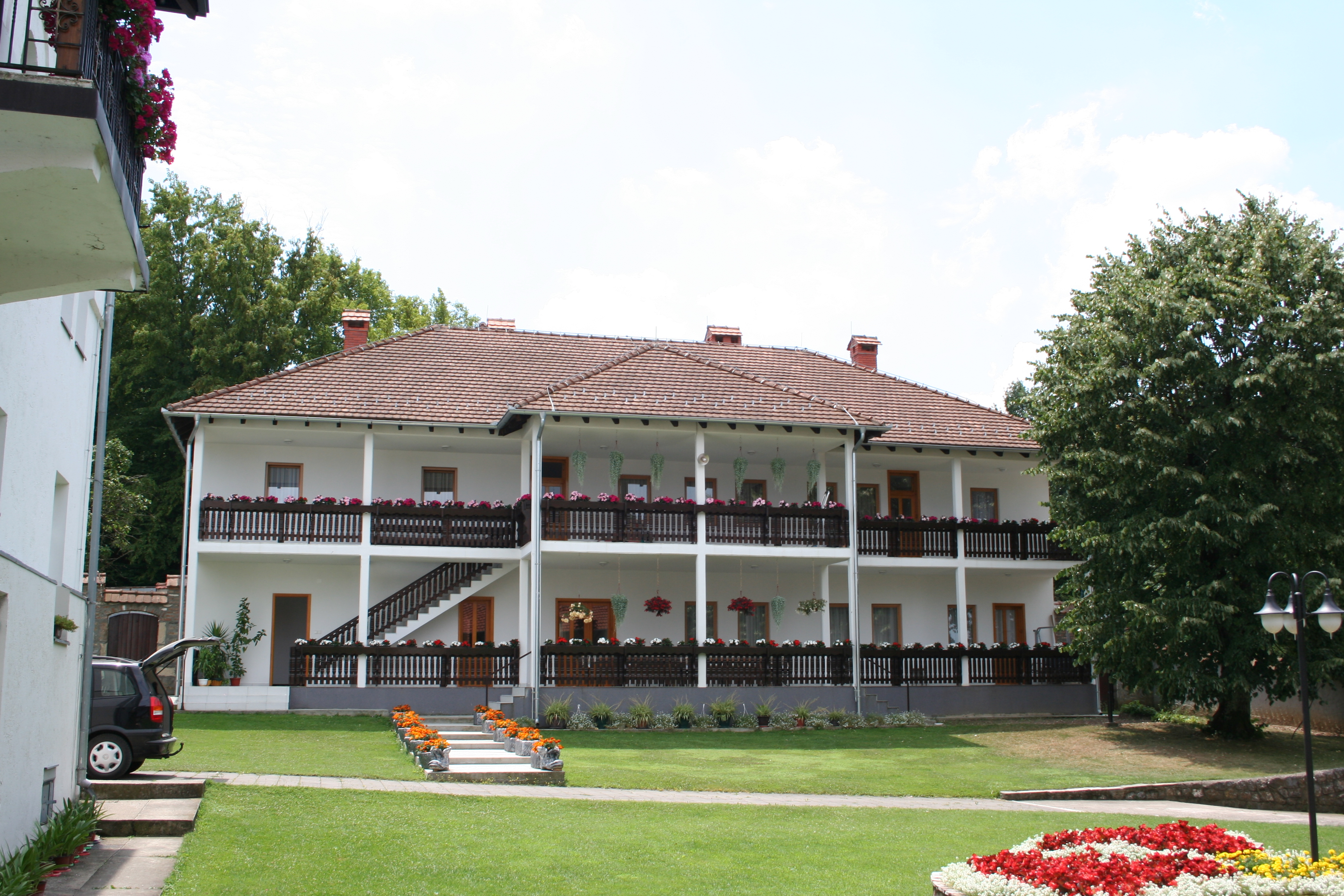
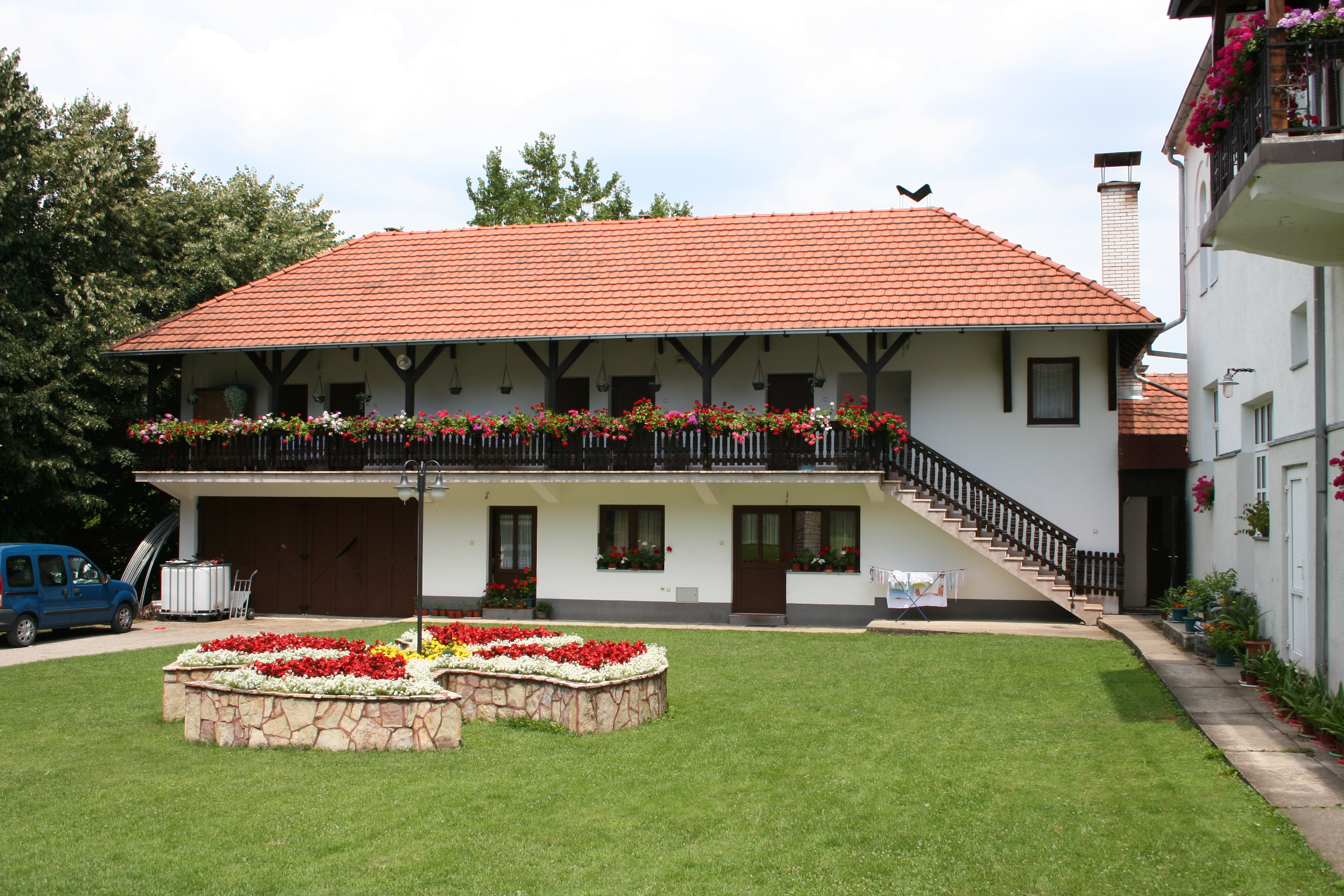
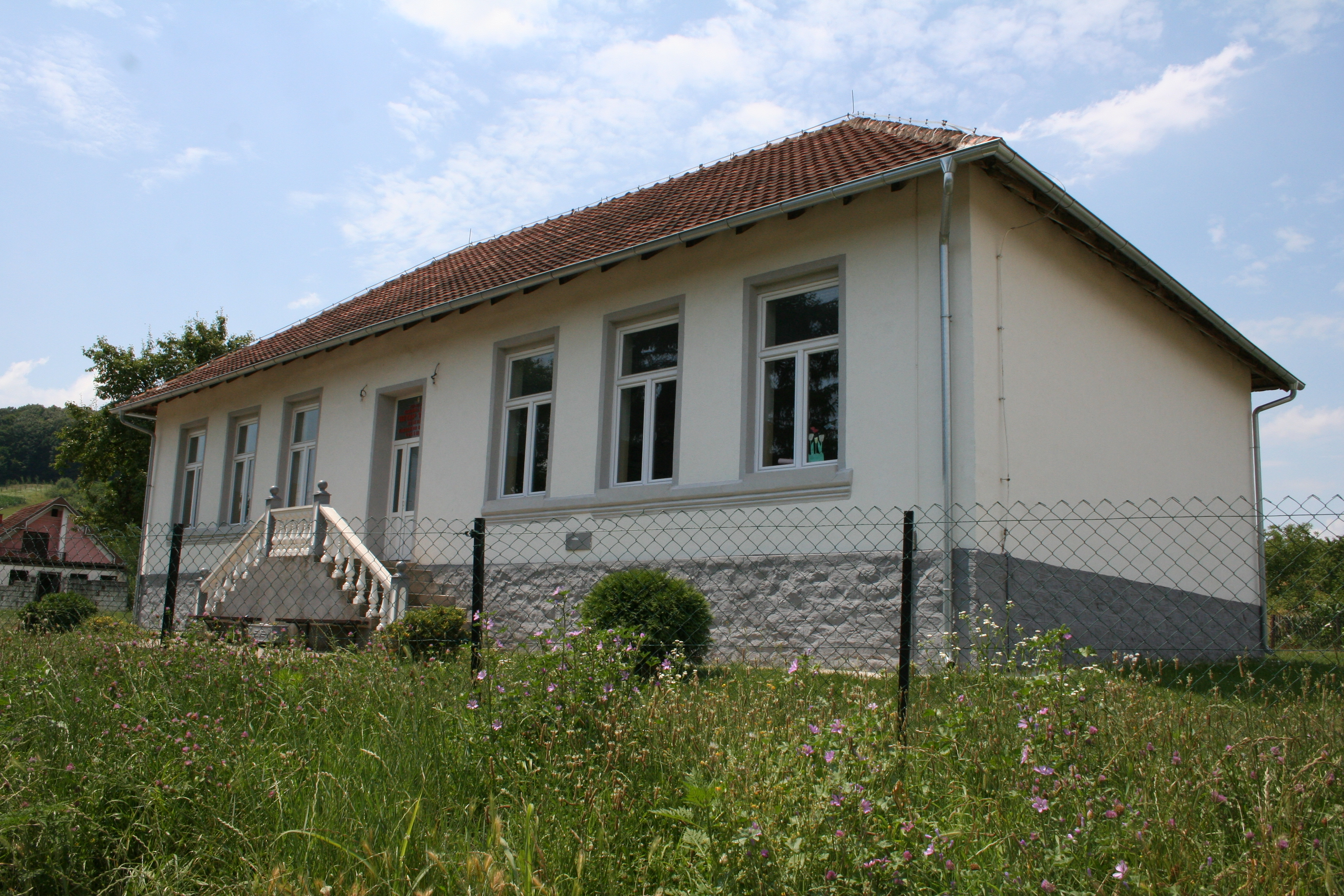
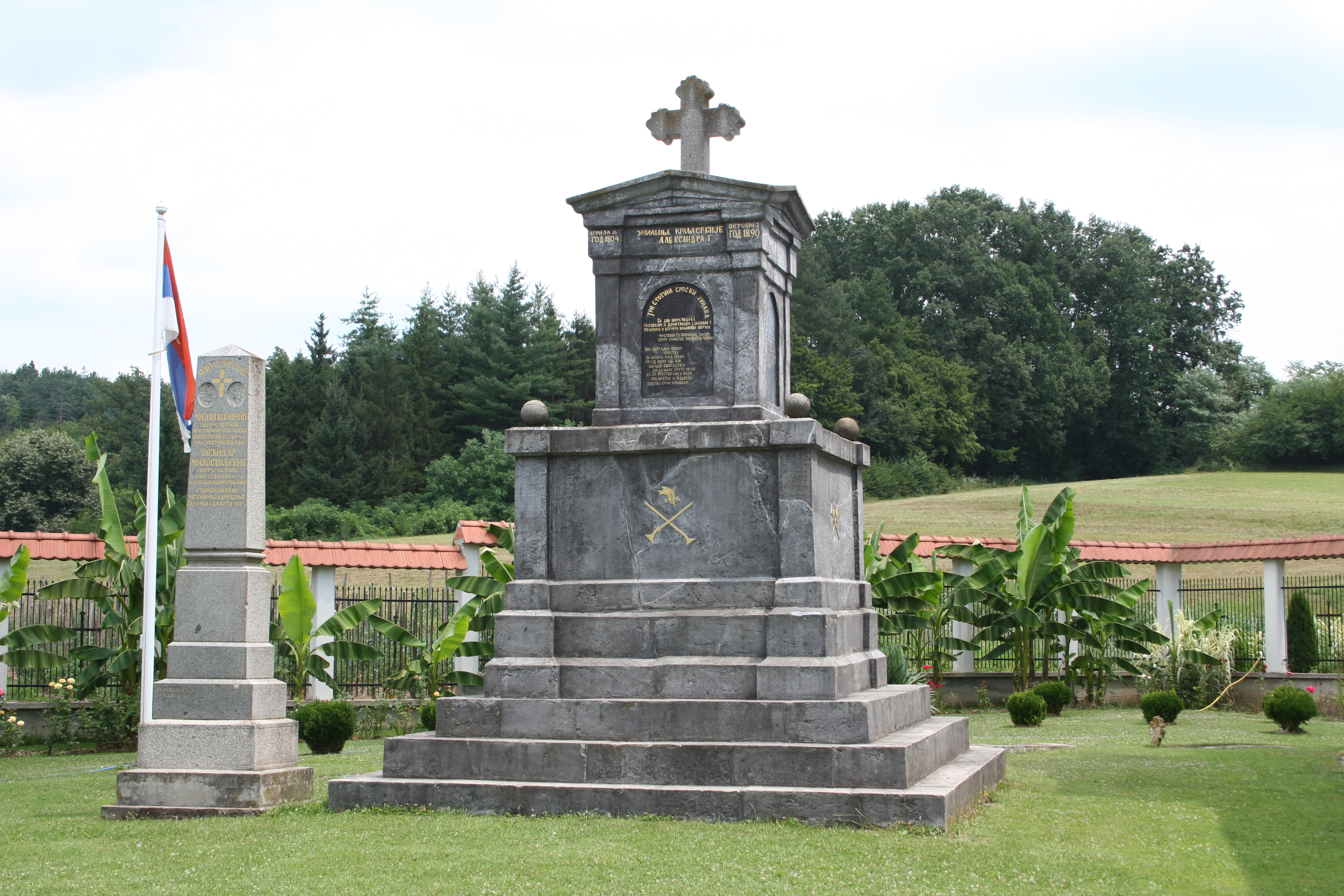

- Location within Serbia
- Coordinates: 44°39′N 19°23′E
- Country: Serbia
- District: Mačva District
- Municipality: Loznica

Population (2002)
  - Total: 881
- Time zone: UTC+1 (CET)
  - Summer (DST): UTC+2 (CEST)

Čokešina is a village in the municipality of Loznica, Serbia. In the 2002 census, the village had a population of 881 people.
