= Radovašnica Monastery =

Monastery and church in Serbia

- Манастир Радовашница
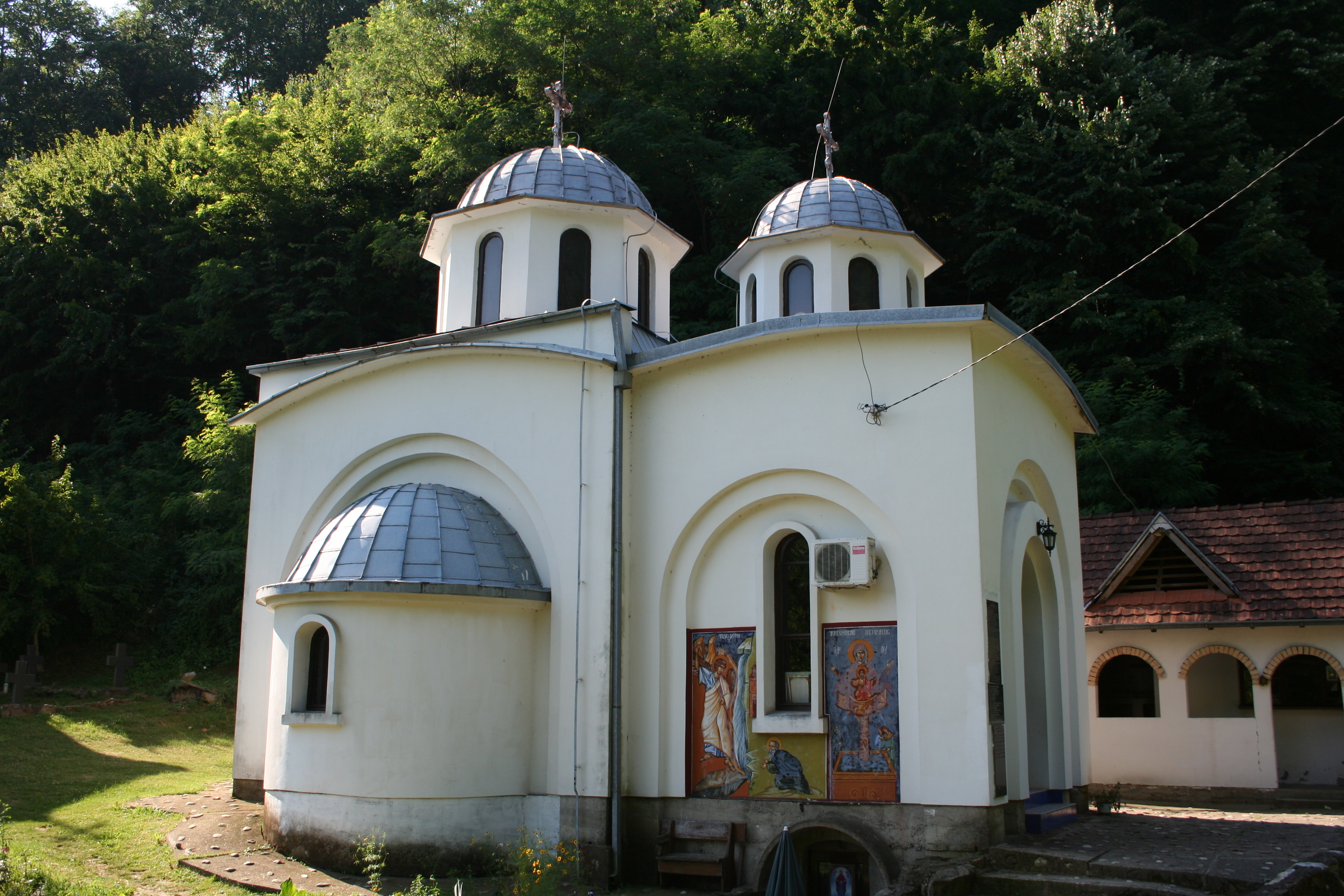
- Radovašnica Monastery
- Denomination: Serbian Orthodox

History
- Founder: Nun Evgenija Abt
- Dedication: Archangels Michael and Gabriel

Architecture
- Architectural type: Serbo-Byzantine architecture
- Style: Serbo-Byzantine style
- Years built: 13th century

Administration
- Diocese: Diocese of Šabac

Radovašnica Monastery (Serbian Cyrillic: Манастир Радовашница) is a Serbian Orthodox monastery in the Diocese of Šabac in Radovašnica. It is considered an immovable cultural property and a cultural monument. (No. SK 2042) Its founder was the nun Evgenija Abt.

== Geography ==
The monastery is located in the village of the same name, twenty-three kilometres from Šabac at the foot of the north side of the mountain Cer. It is dedicated to the archangels Michael and Gabriel. The monastery is surrounded by centuries-old oak, beech and linden forests.

== History ==
The temple of the Holy Archangels Michael and Gabriel, mentioned in the oldest records of the river Radovašnica. The monastery occupied a prominent place before Turkish times. It was built in the Raška style from crushed stone and covered with shingles.

The earliest known written mention of the monastery was in the Turkish census of 1548, while local sources indirectly mention it in 1541. The monastery was built before the arrival of the Turks and was endowed by King Dragutin Nemanjić, who ruled from 1282 to 1316.

Over the course of its history, the monastery was burned down several times by the Turks and again in World War I. It was restored in 1929 then destroyed by the Nazis in October 1941 as part of a punitive operation.

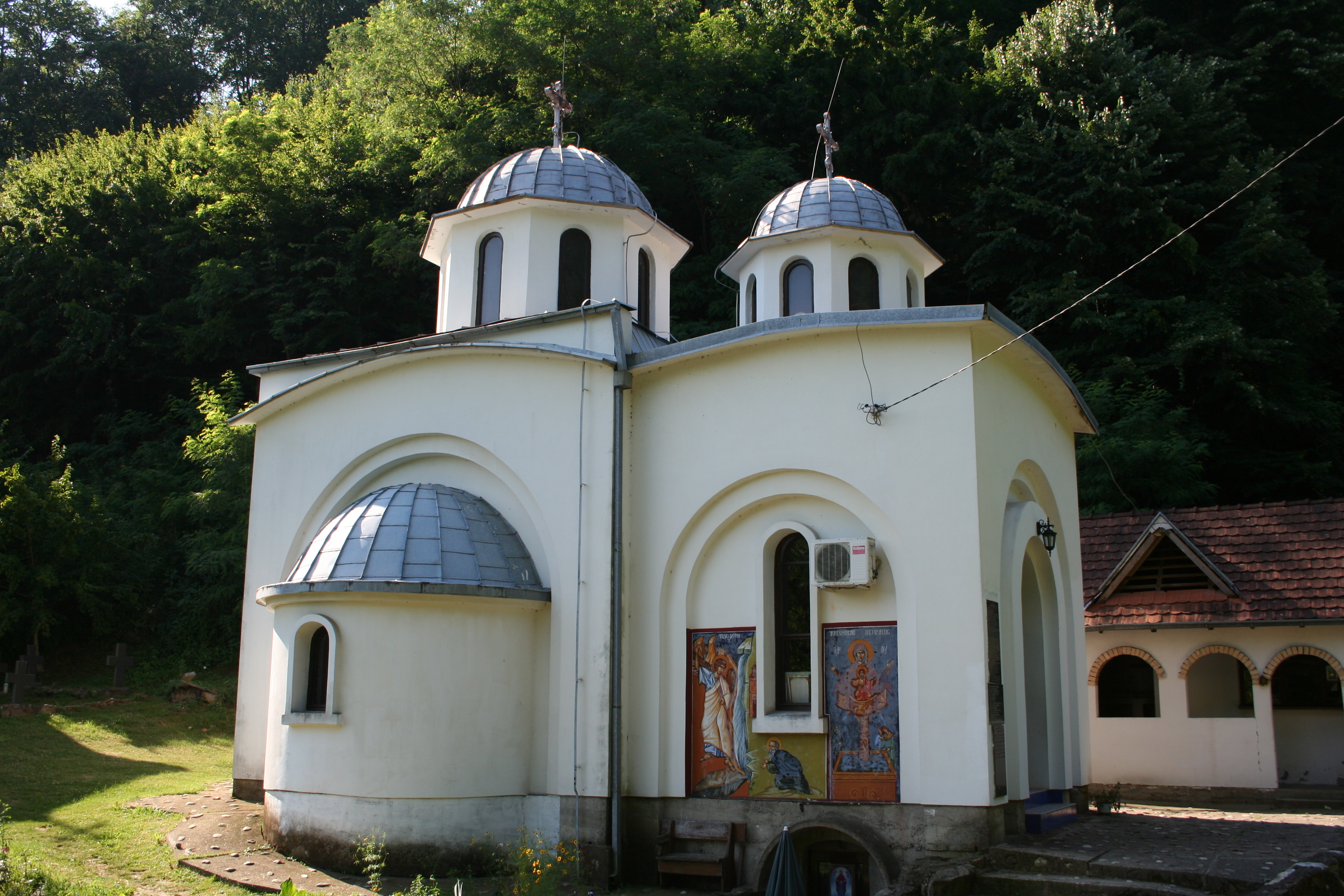
Another view of the old church

In Turkish censuses from 1600 and 1624, another name was given for the monastery, Koanik. This may be related to the old town of Kosana, whose ruins are located at the top of Cer.

In old records, the monastery was also called Temple of the Holy Archangel Michael, or Michael and Gabriel, on the Radovanščica river or Radovantica.

== Architecture ==
The monastery is built with crushed stone and covered with shingles in the style of the Serbo-Byzantine Raška architectural school, in the shape of two crossed rectangles with a narthex and rounded altar apses.

The dome is round on the outside and is supported on the inside by anchor pilasters. The pillars end in arches that support a square pedestal on which the cubes are made. This pedestal emphasized on the outside.

Archaeological excavations carried out in 1991 found that nothing remained of the "old church" except for walls 0.5 m to 1.5 m high. The building was constructed of brick and stone in a clover-leaf shape; the nave was prolonged by a semicircular apse surmounted by a dome. Only fragments remained of the decorative elements. However, this research demonstrated that the building dated from the first half of the 14th century and that, architecturally, it was consistent with the Morava architectural school. The restoration of the "old church" was begun in April 2011, under the Valjevo Heritage Protection Institute.

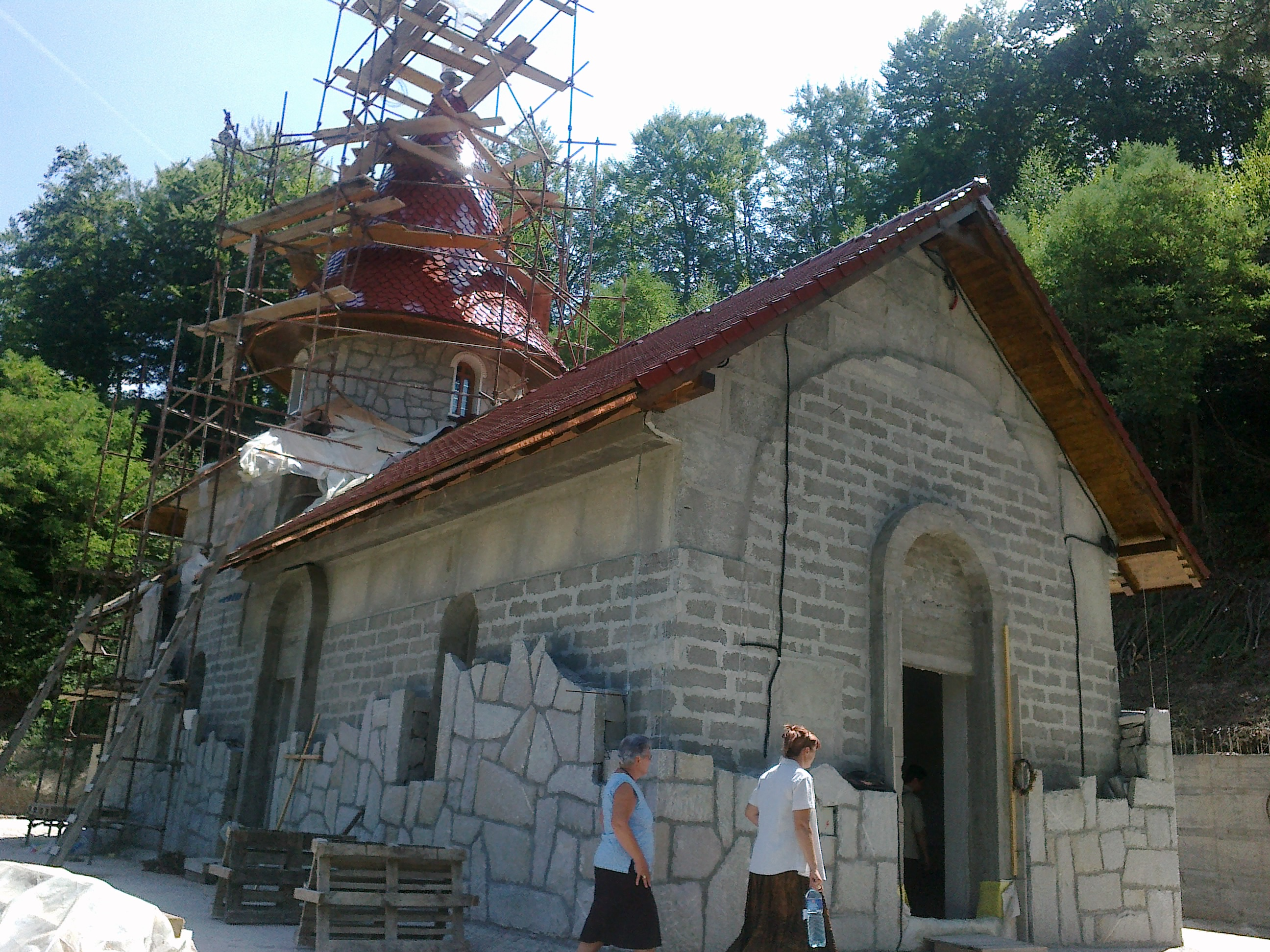

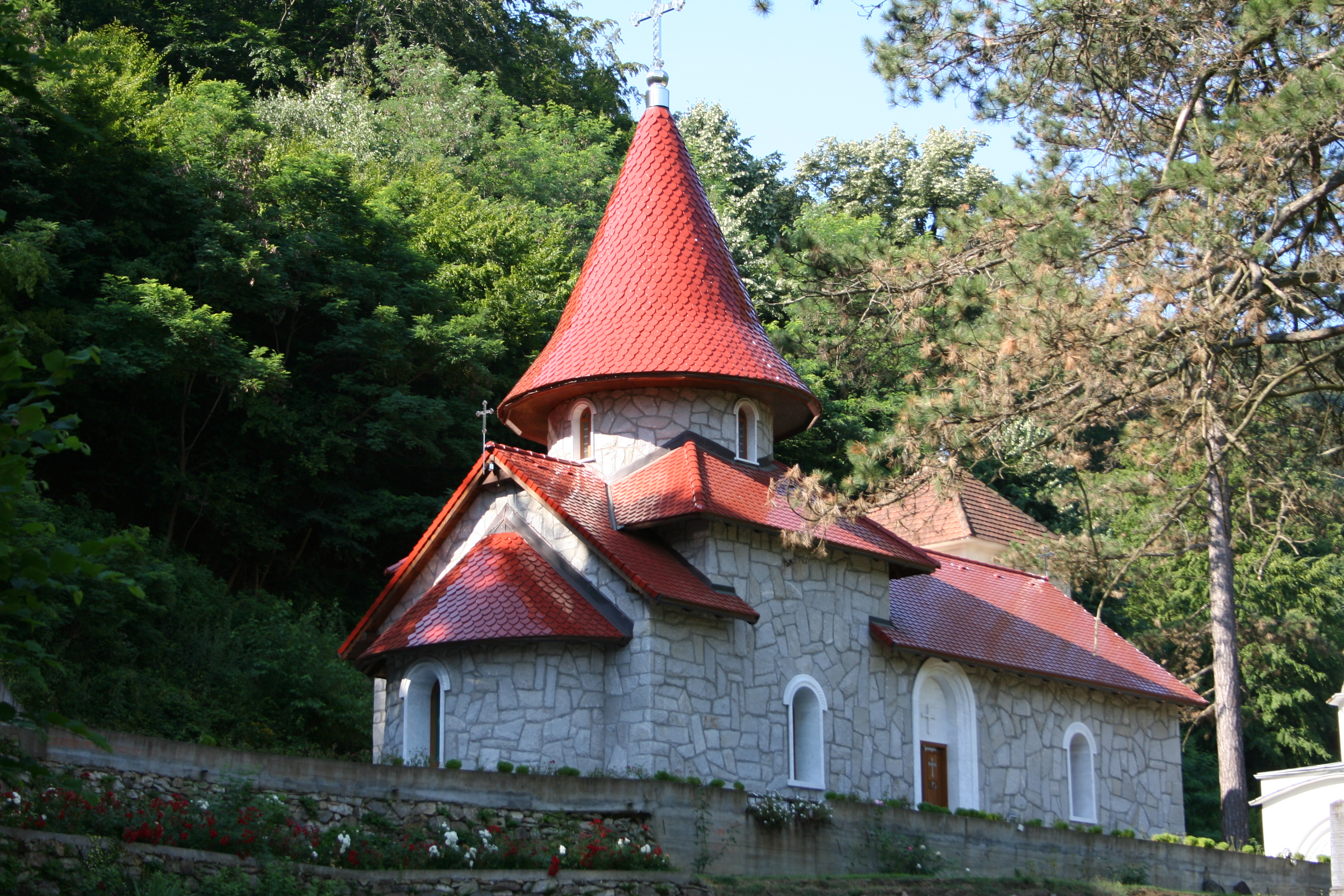

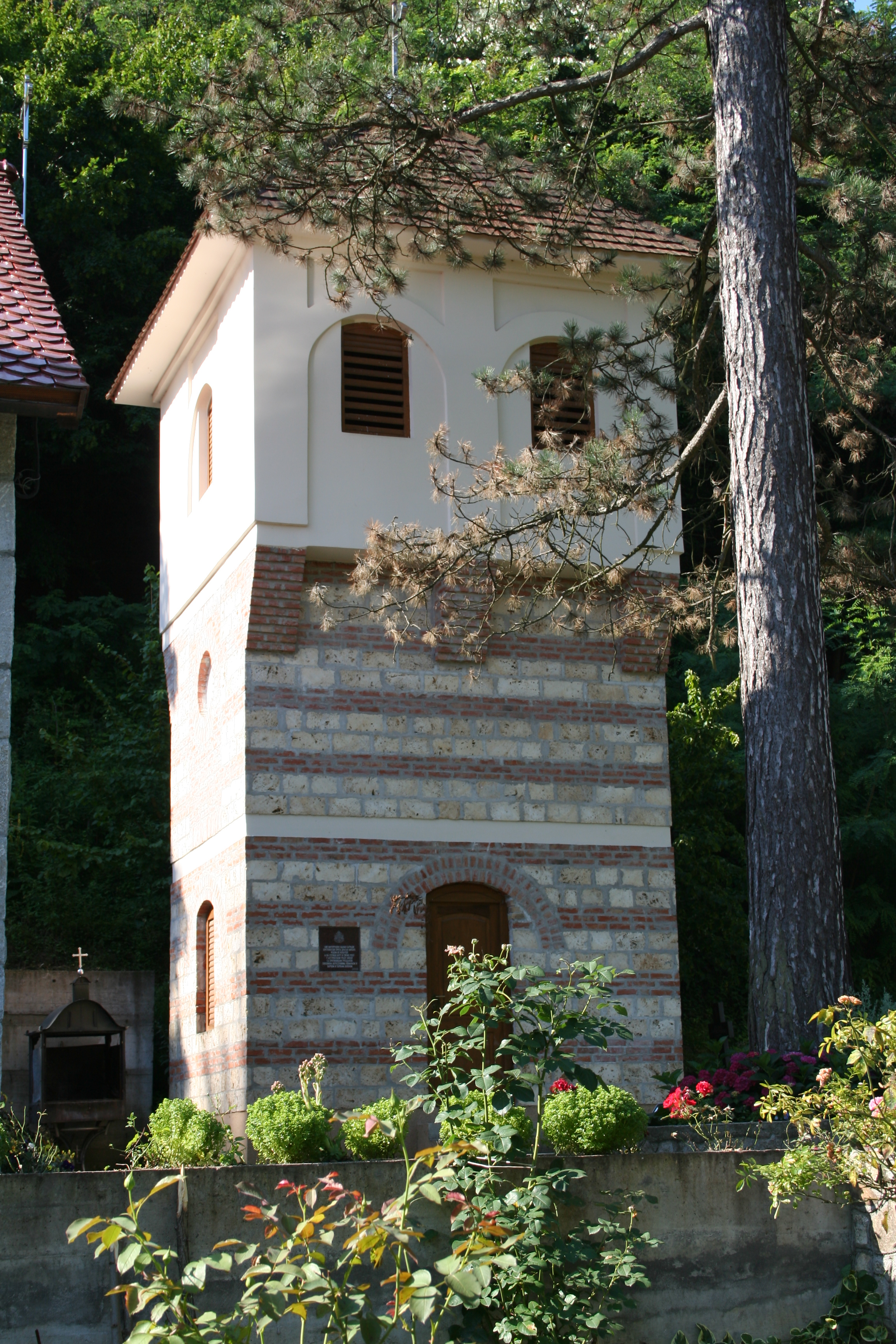

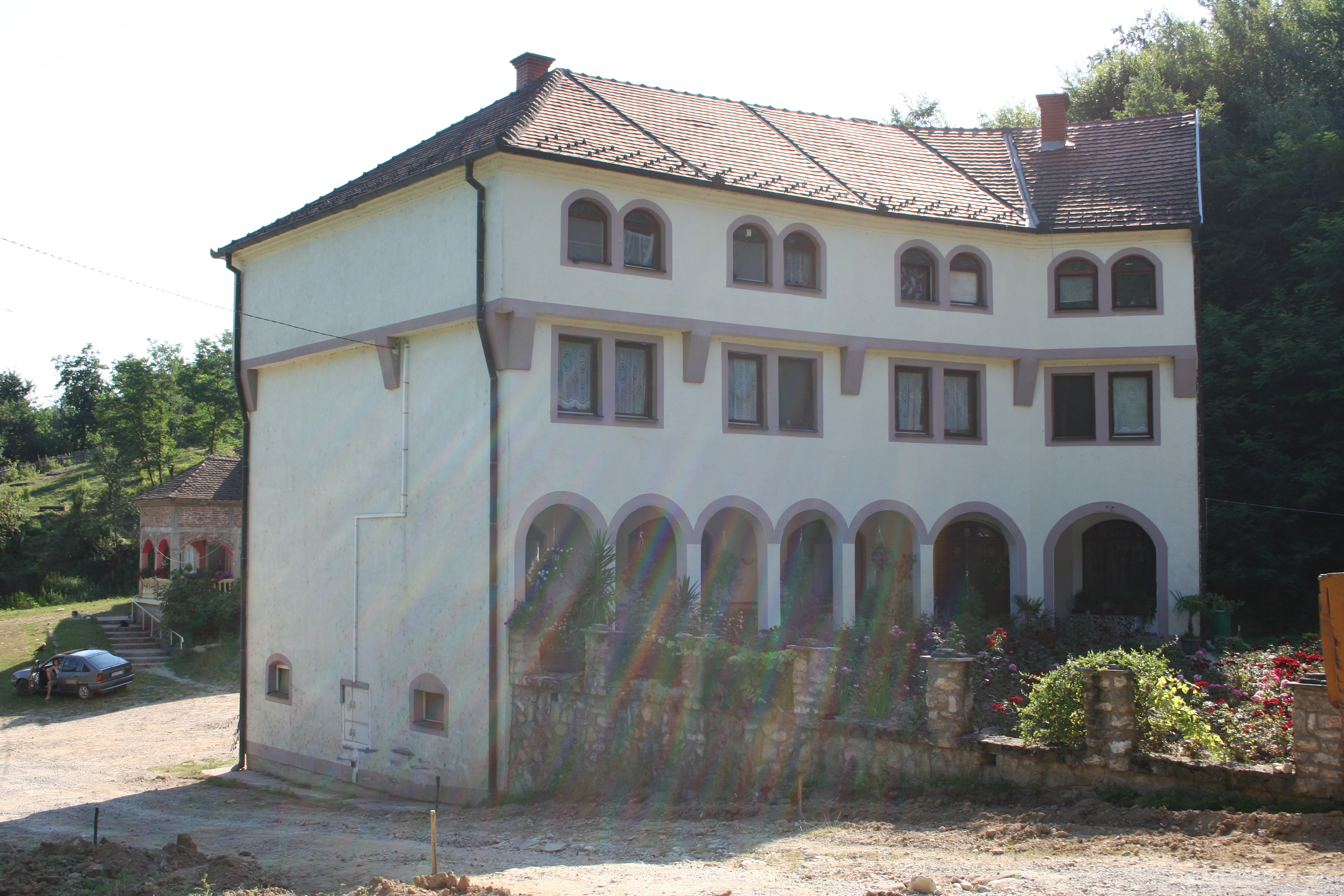
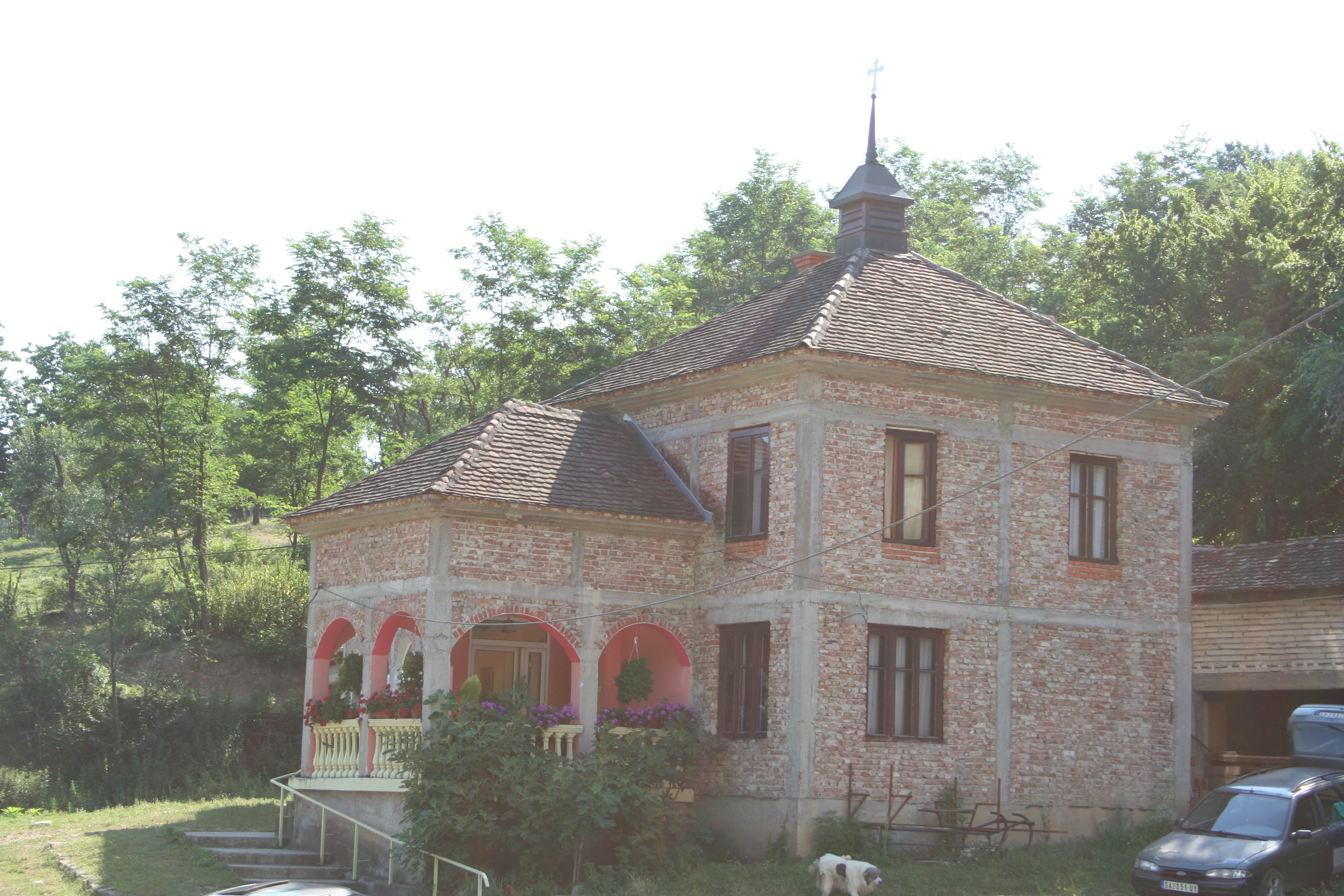

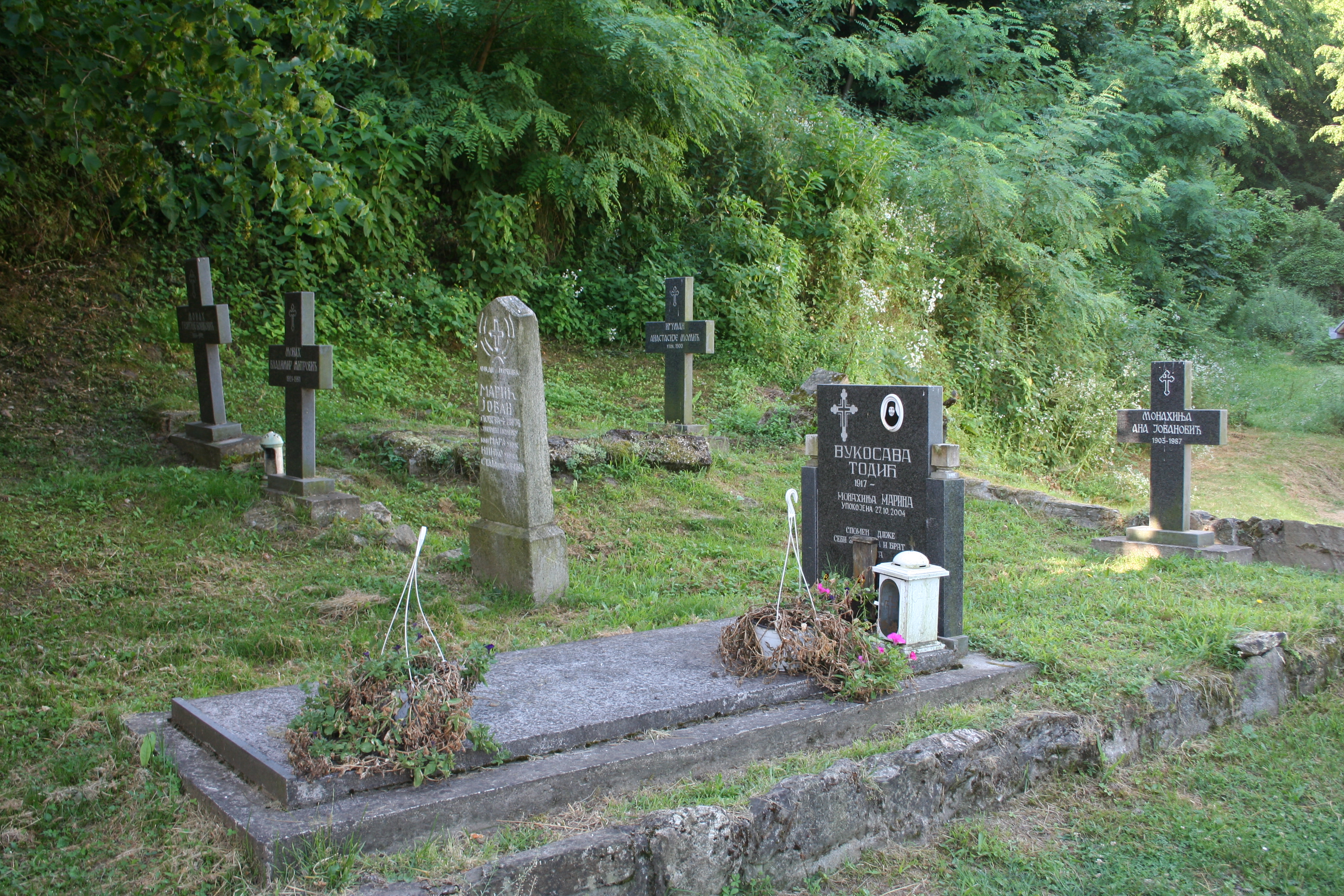

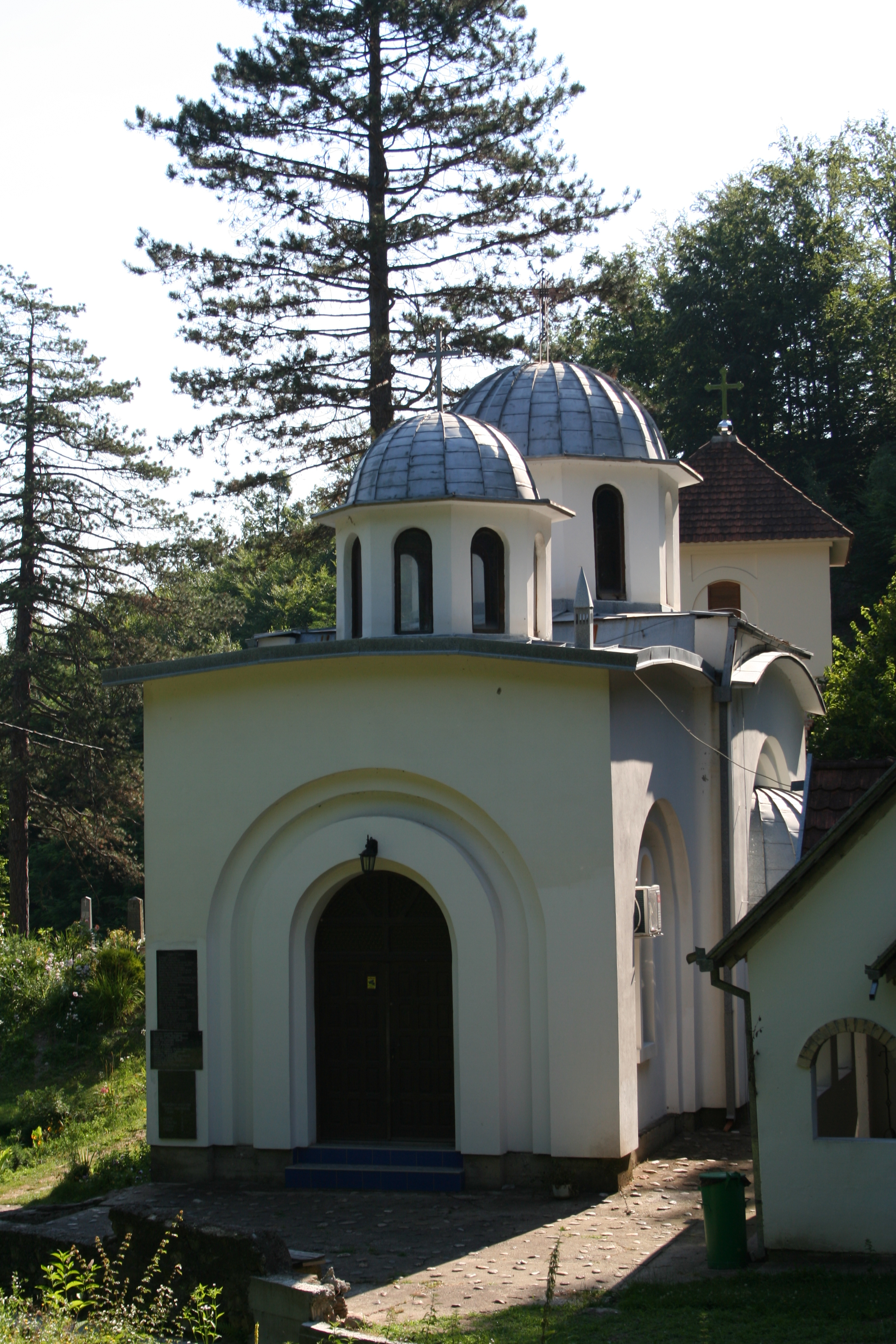
