= Church of St. Nicholas, Erdevik =

Church in Vojvodina, Serbia

Church of St. Nicholas
- Crkva svetog Nikole; Црква светог Николе
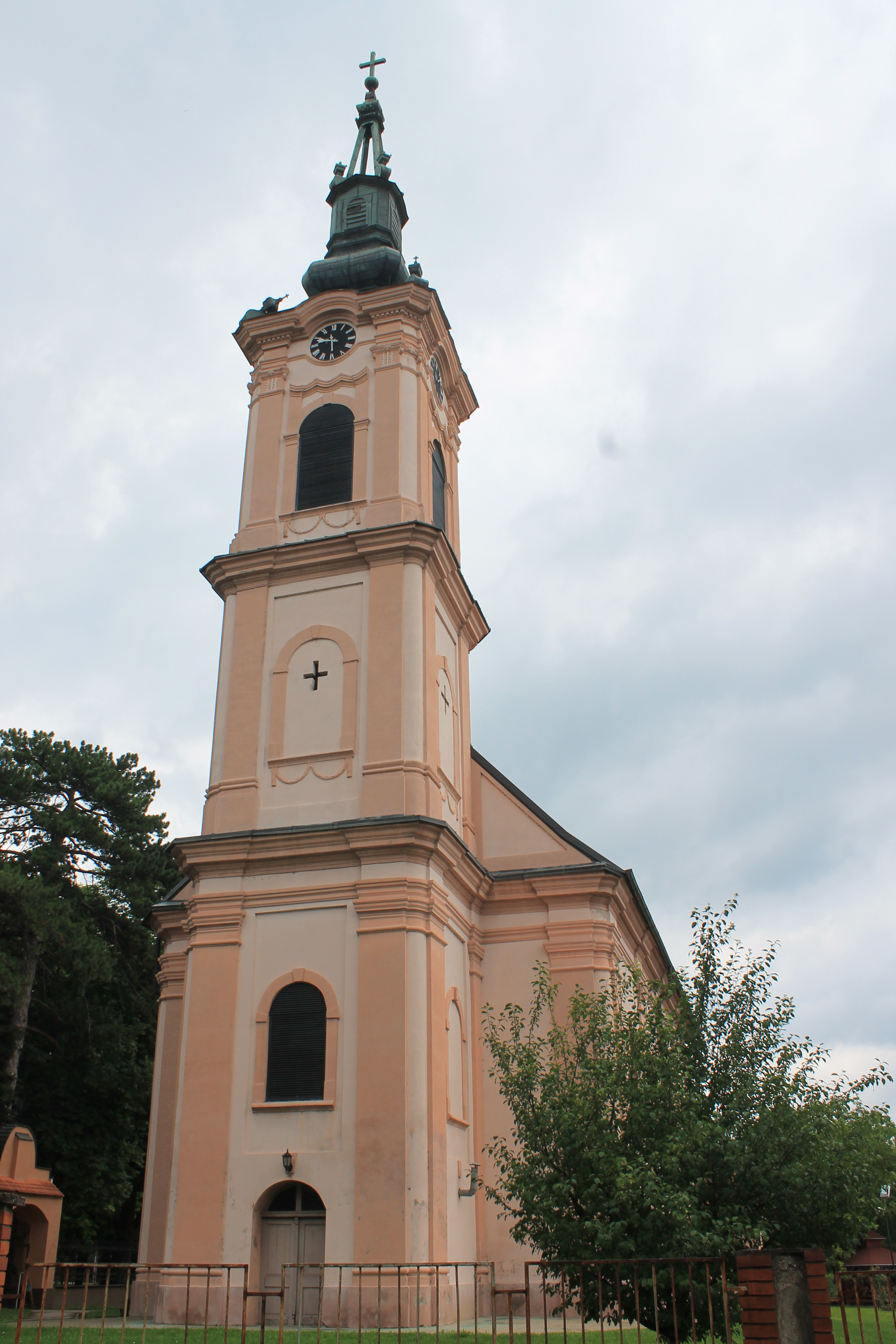
- Church of St Nicholas

- Shown within Vojvodina/Serbia Church of St. Nicholas (Serbia)
- 45°07′01″N 19°24′27″E
- Location: Erdevik, Vojvodina

Cultural Heritage of Serbia
- Type: Cultural Monument of Great Importance
- Designated: 30 December 1997
- Reference no.: СК 1351
- Country: Serbia
- Denomination: Serbian Orthodox

History
- Status: Church
- Dedication: Saint Nicholas

Architecture
- Functional status: Active
- Style: Neo-classicism
- Years built: 1804

Administration
- Archdiocese: Eparchy of Srem

The Church of St. Nicholas (Serbian: Црква светог Николе) in Erdevik is a Serbian Orthodox church in Vojvodina, Serbia dedicated to Saint Nicholas. The church was constructed in 1804. The building is one of three churches in the village with the second one being Roman Catholic church from 1890 and the third Slovak Evangelical Church from 1902. Iconostasis of the church was painted in 1807 by Georgije Bakalović. The church is a single-nave building with a semicircular altar apse in the east, and a representative bell tower. The Institute for the Protection of Cultural Monuments of Sremska Mitrovica adopted the initial decision on protection (no. 189) of 8 December 1977 while the building was listed as a protected cultural heritage of Serbia in 1997.

== See also ==
- Eparchy of Srem
