= Georgije Bakalović =

Serbian painter

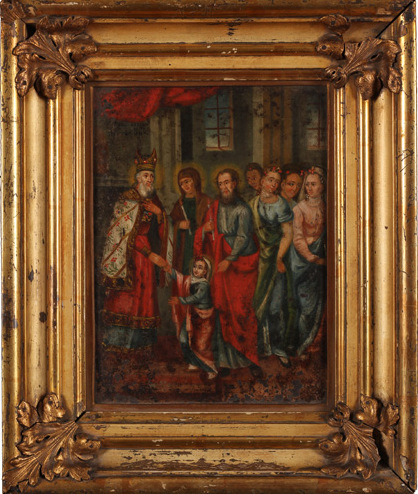
Presentation of Mary by Georgije Bakalović, 1816

Georgije Bakalović (1786 - April 13, 1843) was a Serbian painter from the Austrian Empire.

== Biography ==
Bakalović was born in Sremski Karlovci, and studied there with the painter Stefan Gavrilović. He worked mostly iconostasis, murals and portraits. One of the iconostasis, he worked in the company of the painter and goldsmith Pavel Đurković.

Bakalović painted the iconostasis and vault at Erdevik in 1817, the vault of the Upper Church of Sremski Karlovci in 1824, vaulted and executed 12 festive icons for the Church in Vrdnik in 1825, iconostasis in Čerević in 1827, vault, and icons at Uspenjske, restoration and renovation of the church iconostasis in the church Nikolaiviertel Church in Irig in 1827, iconostasis and arches for the Jovanovski Church in Novi Sad in 1830, and iconostasis for the monastery at Grgeteg in 1830 (burned 1841). Bakalović also painted iconostasis in 1840 at Prhovo and Novi Banovci.

He continued his work painting iconostasis in the monastery Radovašnica in 1839, churches and monasteries in Zajecar in 1840, churches in Aleksinac in 1841, and churches in Negotin in 1842.

He also painted the portraits of Miloš Obrenović I, Prince of Serbia, Stefan Stratimirović, and Ivan Knežević, better known as Knyaz Ivo of Semberija. He died in Ruma 13 April 1843.

== See also ==
- List of painters from Serbia
