= Memorial Ossuary, Cer =

WWI memorial in Tekeriš, Serbia

Coordinates: 44.5518°N 19.5525°E

Memorial ossuary Cer
- Serbia
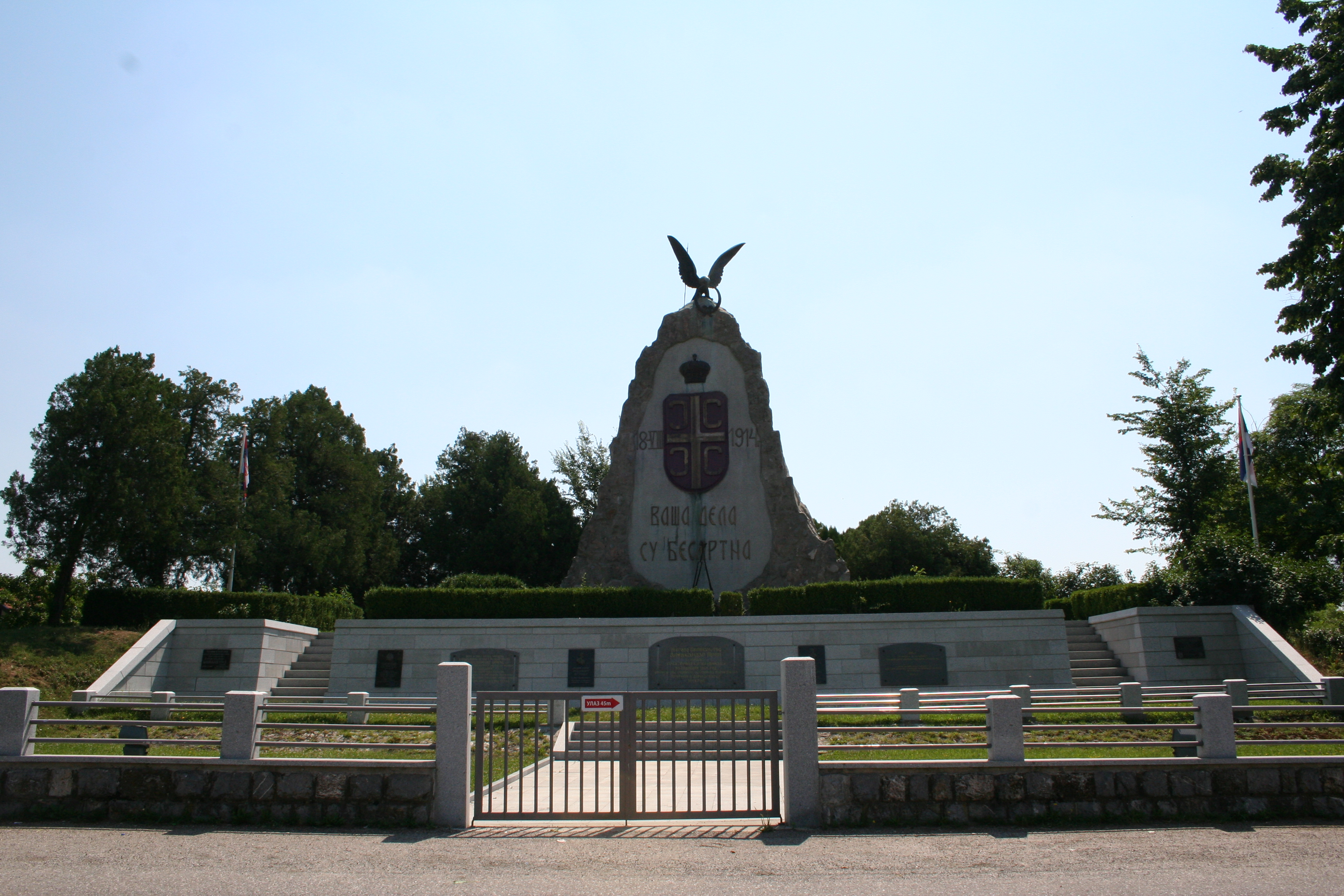
- Memorial ossuary
- For World War I heroes
- Established: 1928
- Location: Tekeriš, Serbia near Loznica

Cultural Heritage of Serbia
- Type: Historic Landmark of Exceptional Importance
- Designated: 26 September 2001
- Reference no.: ZM 60

The Cer Memorial (Serbian: Спомен костурница на Церу / Spomen kosturnica na Ceru) is a war memorial commemorate the Battle of Cer, fought in 1914 as part of the First World War. It is situated on the battlefield, in the village of Tekeriš on the mountain Cer, near Loznica, Serbia. Memorial ossuary Cer is on the list of Immovable Cultural Heritage of Exceptional Importance.

== History ==
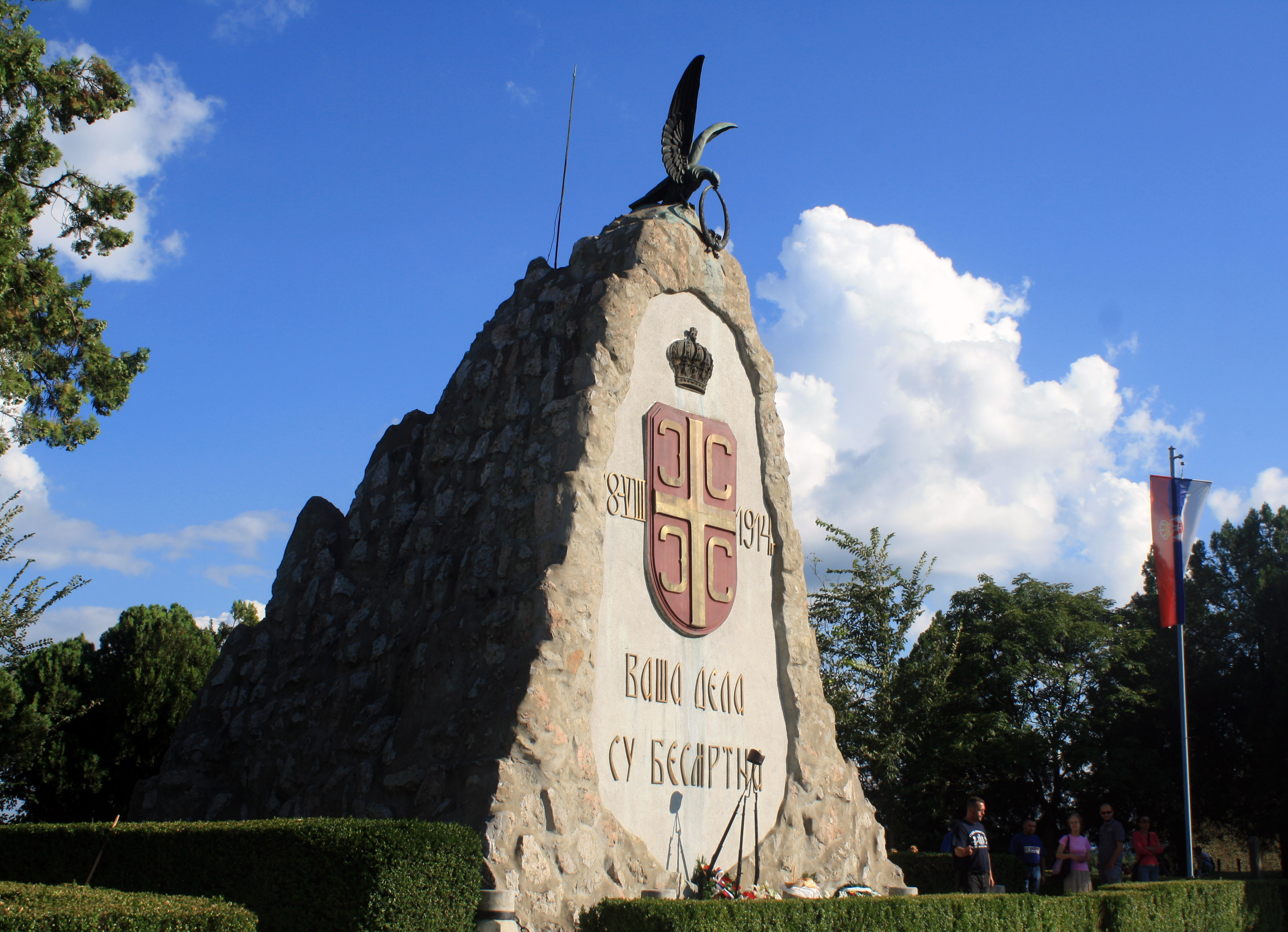
A monument with a Serbian cross.

It was built in 1927 and 1928, for the 10th anniversary of the end of First World War. Battle of Cer took place from 15 to 19 August 1914 during the First World War, between the Serbian and Austro-Hungarian army. In the battle the Austro-Hungarian army was defeated and was forced to withdraw. The Battle of Cer is considered the first battle of the Great War and the first Allied victory. The project for the memorial complex was done by the Russian engineer Sergije Bagenski.

The memorial complex consists of five parts, a monument, a memorial ossuary, a chapel, a memorial fountain and a pavilion of a museological exhibition.

The ossuary houses 3042 remains of Serbian and Austro-Hungarian soldiers who died and were buried in villages during the battle of the First World War. All exhumed and transferred soldiers are listed as unknown, but 128 names of killed Serbian soldiers have been preserved. A total of 3,042 remains, 2,230 Serb and 812 Czech soldiers were housed in the ossuary.

The memorial ossuary is located under the monument, buried in the ground. The monument is in the shape of a natural rock, pyramidal in shape, about 10m high. It is made of slightly worked stone. The rock itself should be associated with the Cer mountain. The front, western part of the monument is flattened in the central part and a large Serbian coat of arms and a crown above it is placed on it. Below the coat of arms is the inscription: YOUR WORKS ARE IMMORTAL, and on the left and right sides of the coat of arms the decisive date of the Battle of Cer: August 18, 1914.

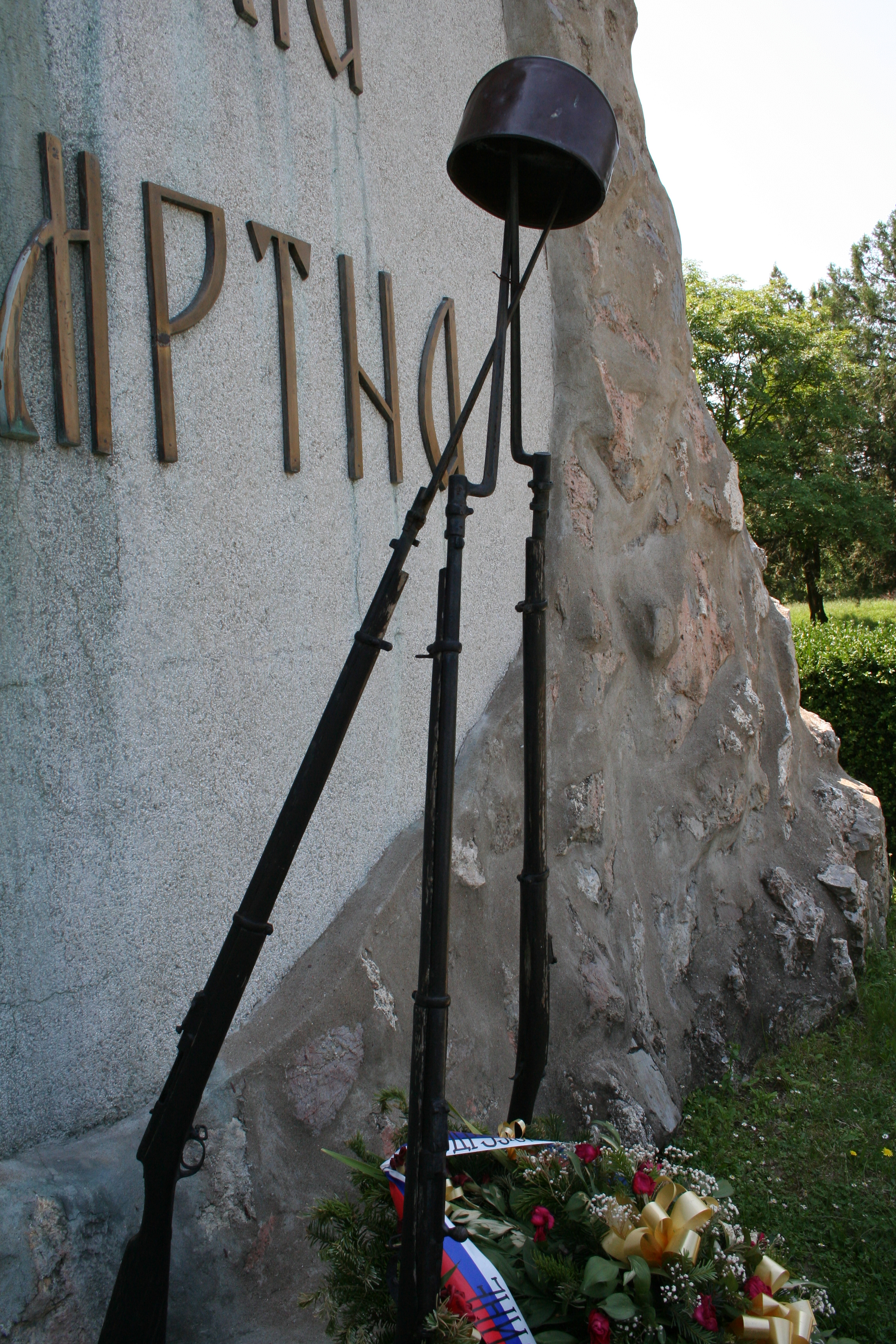
Detail of the monument.

In front of the monument is a composition, which consists of three rifles with bayonets, leaning against each other, with a šajkača on top of the bayonet. At the top of the monument is a bronze figure of an eagle with outstretched wings, holding a laurel wreath in its beak. Rifles with shajkacs and an eagle with a laurel wreath have a common symbolism – marking the battle that ended with the Serbian victory. The rifles are no longer in action, so they are covered by the winner's hat, and the eagle, additionally symbolizing victory in the whole war, wears a wreath as a sign of victory, while its outstretched wings symbolize the won freedom.

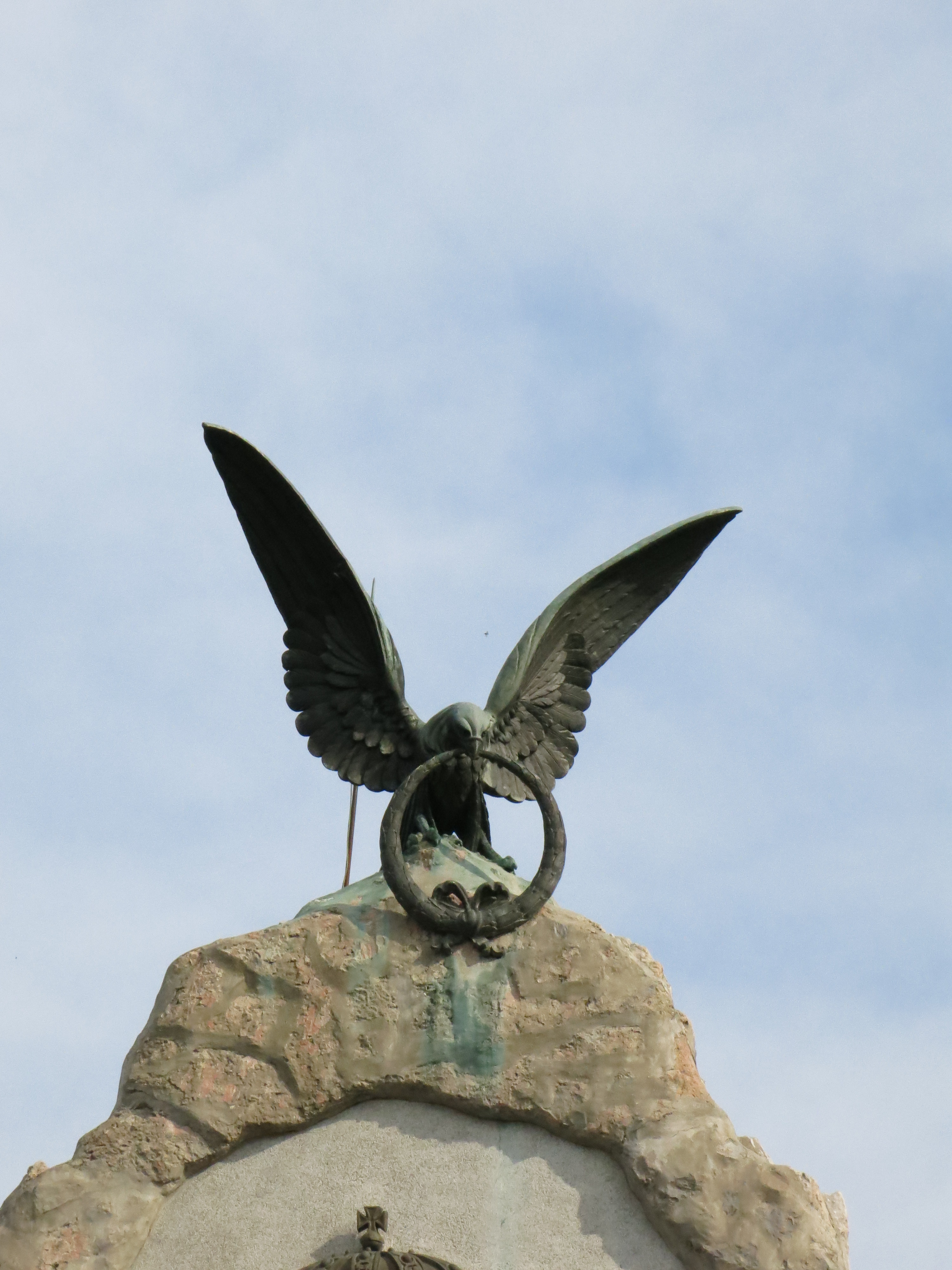
Eagle with a laurel wreath.

In front of the ossuary there is a slope, on which there is a retaining wall with memorial plaques. During the solemn consecration, there were three plaques on it. On the middle plaque, it is written in golden letters that the memorial ossuary was discovered by King Alexander. The left plaque speaks of the suffering of Czechoslovak soldiers during the Battle of Cer, and the right plaque speaks of who erected the monument. In later periods, plates with bas-reliefs of Duke Radomir Putnik and Stepa Stepanović were added between them. Plaques were added on the sides on the occasion of the 25th anniversary of the battle and in honor of the Italian volunteers in the Serbian army. From the plateau in front of the wall with slabs, the monument itself is reached via steps, which are located on both sides of the monument.

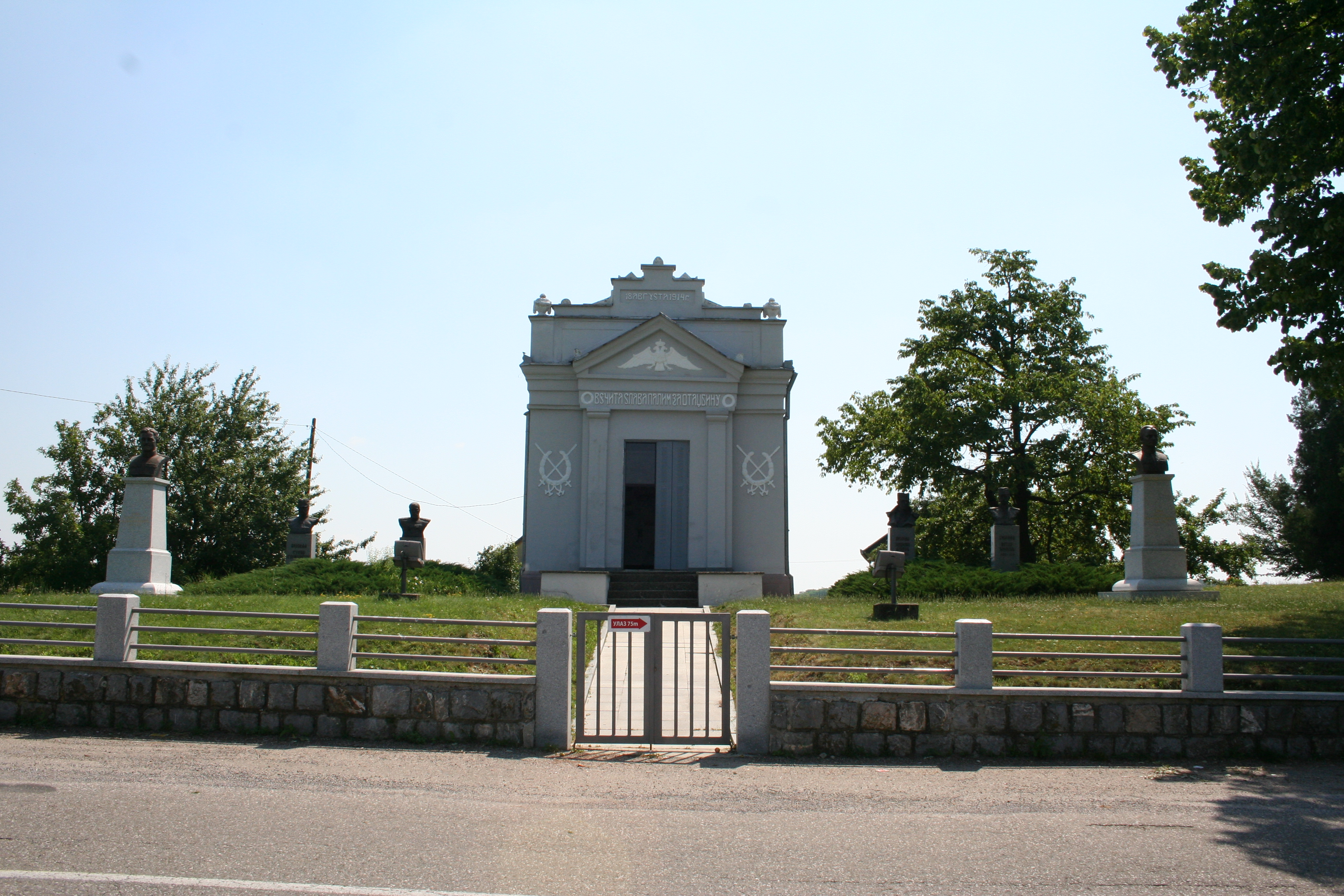
A chapel.

On June 28, 1928, the ceremony of consecrating the ossuary on Cer was a big event, which was attended by: Prime Minister Velja Vukicevic, National Assembly Speaker Ninko Peric, several ministers and generals, Czechoslovak Ambassador Jan Seba, Czechoslovak Army Chief of Staff General Jan Syrový and many citizens. At the very end of the ceremony, King Aleksandar I unveiled the monument.

Also, a park was formed on the surrounding area and a building containing a chamber for the deposition of wreaths and an apartment for the keeper was built north of the monument. A memorial fountain, consecrated on the 28th of June 1932, was also built in the immediate vicinity of the memorial ossuary.
