= Cer (mountain) =

Mountain in Serbia

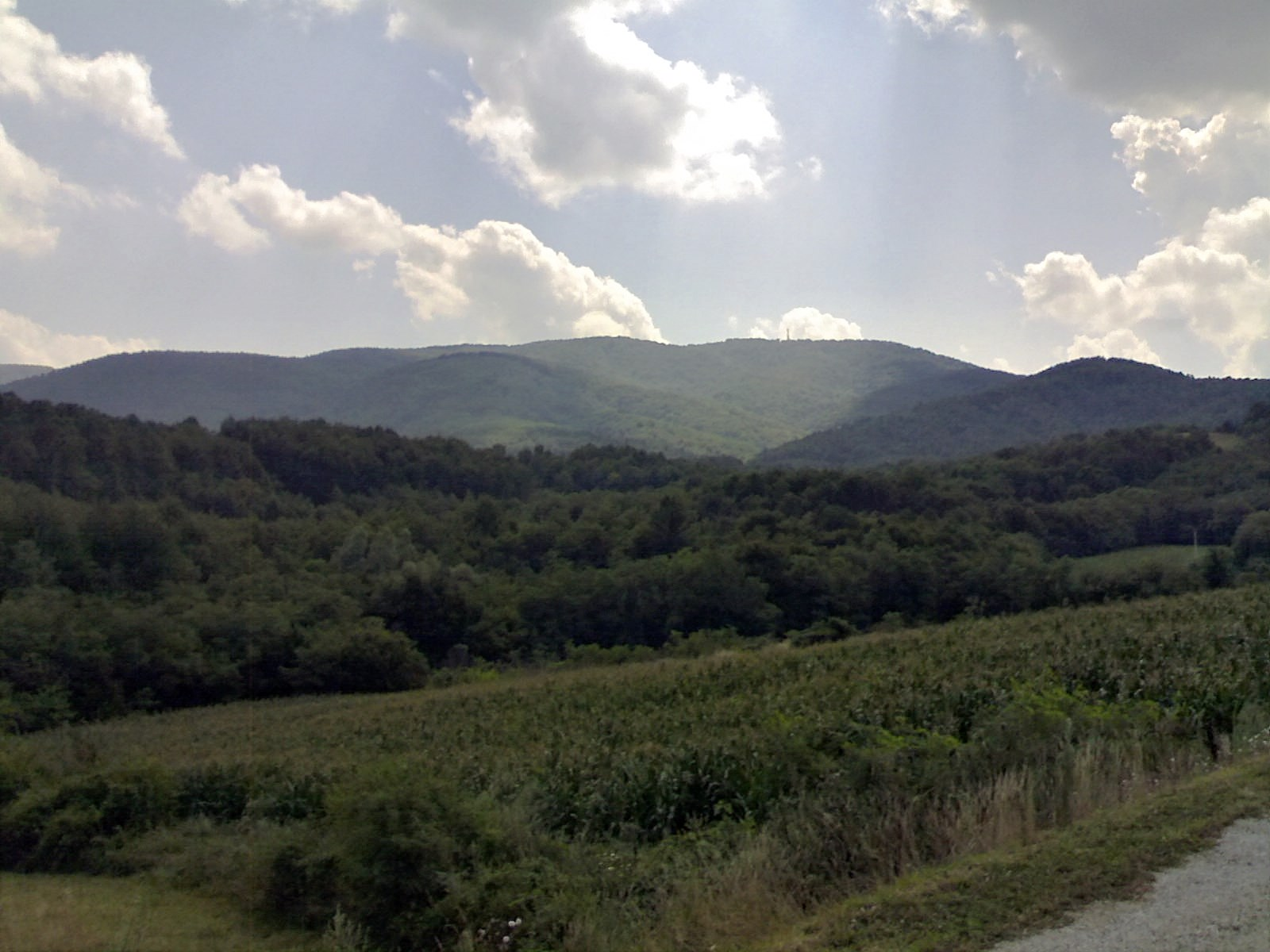

Highest point
- Elevation: 689 m (2,260 ft)
- Coordinates: 44°36′11″N 19°29′39″E

Geography
- Location within Serbia
- Location: Western Serbia
- Parent range: Dinaric Alps

Cer (Serbian Cyrillic: Цер, pronounced [tsɛr]) is a mountain in western Serbia, 30 kilometers to the south of Šabac and some 100 kilometers to the west of Belgrade. The highest peak has an elevation of 689 m (2,260 ft) above sea level. Cer is rich in the Turkey oak forests after which it was named.

== History ==
During World War I, the Battle of Cer was fought on Cer, in which Serbian Army defeated Austro-Hungarian Army. The Cer Memorial is located in Tekeriš, a village on the southeastern slopes of the mountain, where the battle took place on August 15–19, 1914.

== See also ==
- List of mountains in Serbia

== Sources ==
- Grčić, Mirko D., and Ljiljana Grčić. "The mountain Cer: Potentials for tourism development." Glasnik Srpskog geografskog drustva 83.2 (2003): 11-18.
- Grcic, M., and Lj Grcic. "The mountain Cer [Serbia]-its state, protection and eco-tourism development possibilities." (2003).
- Grčić, Mirko, and Ljiljana Grčić. "Potentials for development of spa tourism in region of Cer Mountain: Western Serbia." Glasnik Srpskog geografskog drustva 86.1 (2006): 231-244.
