= Ivan Knežević (revolutionary) =

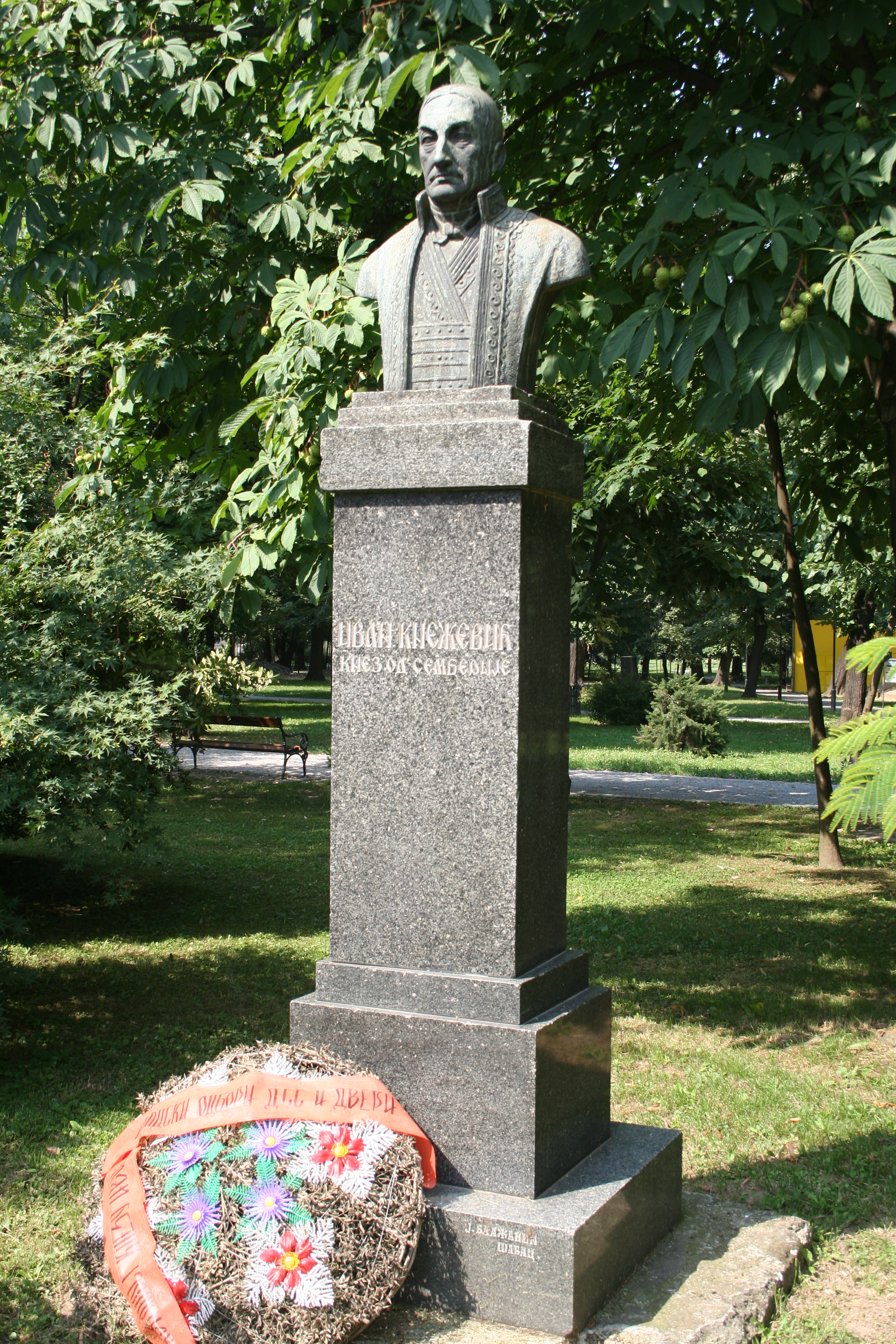
- Born: 1760; Popovi, Bijeljina
- Died: 29 June 1840 (aged 79–80); Šabac
- Military career
- Other work: Voivode and duke

Ivan Knežević (Serbian Cyrillic: Иван Кнежевић) (Popovi, Bijeljina, 1760 - Šabac, 29 June 1840) better known to the people as Knez Ivo of Semberija was a Serb voivode and duke over all the villages of the then Bijeljina Nahia, who most notably participated in the First Serbian Uprising.

Knyaz Ivo was born in Popovi near Bijeljina. Besides Filip Višnjić, he is one of the most important Serbian historical figures born in Semberija and as such his likeness appears on the coat of arms of the municipality of Bijeljina.

== Life in Semberija ==
Knez Ivo, a voivode over all 12 villages of the Bijeljina nahia, in 1806, during the First Serbian Uprising helped in freeing Serbs from the Ottoman rule. In 1809, he led the insurgents in Semberija in the "offensive plan" in which Karađorđe attempted to liberate the whole of Bosnia and Herzegovina and all Serbian lands in the Balkans. However, due to the unexpected incursion of the Turks into Pomoravlje, the insurgent armies withdrew from Bosnia to Serbia, fearing retaliation from the Turks, and Knyaz Ivo left with them.

== Refugee ==
In 1809, Knyaz Ivo settled with his insurgents in Mačva and the villages along the Sava, where he received the title of duke of Serb refugees. During that time, from 1809 to 1813, he was in the military sense under the command of Duke and priest Luka Lazarević in Šabac. When Karađorđe's Serbia collapsed in 1813, Knyaz Ivo of Semberija again decided to become an exile and lived in Srem, in the Austrian Empire, until after 1820.

The new master of Serbia, Prince Miloš Obrenović, allowed Knyaz Ivo to settle again in Šabac in 1820, where he appointed him a member of the Municipal Court. He could not perform this service, so in the last years of his life he was a janitor at the Šabac high school for a short time, and at the end of his life, he was also a protégé of Bishop Maksim at the episcopal residence in Šabac.

He died on 29 June (according to the Old Style calendar) in 1840. His portrait was painted by Georgije Bakalović and is today kept in the National Museum in Belgrade.

== Works about Prince Ivo of Semberije ==
Knyaz Ivo of Semberija was sung of in Filip Višnjić's song "Knez Ivan Knežević", which also received a historical introduction written by Vuk Karadžić. Also, Branislav Nušić wrote the tragedy "Prince Ivo of Semberia", on the basis of which an opera by Isidor Bajić of the same title was also composed.

== Legacy ==
A school in Bijeljina is named after him.
