= Jovan Jovanović (bishop) =

Serbian Orthodox Bishop (1732–1805)

Bishop Jovan Jovanović (1732 – 12 April 1805) was the Serbian Orthodox Bishop of Bačka before and during Karađorđe's Serbia, from 1786 to 1805. He was involved in inspiring the people in their determination to overthrow the Turkish yoke.

== Biography ==
Bishop Jovan was born in Sremski Karlovci in 1732, where he finished primary and secondary school. During his schooling, he was a cadet of the Bishop of Timisoara, Vićentije Jovanović Vidak, the future Metropolitan of Sremski Karlovci. He was first a deacon at the "Upper Church" (Vavedenjska) in Karlovac. When he was revived, he was invited to the Bezdin monastery because of his reputation as a great chanter.

After receiving the monastic rank in the Bezdin monastery, he was promoted to the rank of the archdeacon. During the life of Abbot Vasilije (Nedeljković) of Novo Hopovo, Archimandrite Jovan was appointed rector of the Hopovo monastery. In 1776, in the Hopovo monastery, he was portrayed by the famous Serbian painter Teodor Kračun.

== Episcopal vocation ==
At the synod session in Timisoara, on 2 November 1783, on the recommendation of the royal commissioner, headed by Count Janković, he was elected bishop of Eparchy of Gornji Karlovac and soon consecrated in Karlovac by Metropolitan Mojsije Putnik. During his short-term three-year administration of the Eparchy of Gornji Karlovac, he built a new bishop's court in Plaški with the funds of Bishop Danilo Jakšić. During his episcopal duty, he relied on the Krajina border officers, which is why he came into conflict with the local clergy and pious people. He wrote epistles to the people, tried to teach them about family and class duties, and proper fasting. At the beginning of 1786, he asked to be transferred from there to Banat, to the Vršac diocese, but he did not receive the support of the Synod.

By a state decree of 14 June 1786, without the knowledge of the Synod of Bishops, he was transferred to the position of Bishop of Bačka. Jovan was installed in October 1786 by the viceroy of Bačka, Jovan Latinović, and the archimandrite of Krušedol, Pantelejmon Hranisavljević.

In 1800, in his residence in Novi Sad, a two-month theological course was held, conducted by the priest Jovan Petrović, the parish priest of Subotica. While visiting the diocese, he died on 12 April 1805 in Sombor and was buried in Sombor's St. George's Church. His remains are still under the central church chandelier, they are placed in the older tomb of Count Jovan Janko Branković (who died in 1734 and whose bones were moved in 1805) without any marking. Since 2011, an inscription was placed on the plaque above the main entrance to the temple, which testifies that Bishop Jovanović's burial place.

== The first newspaper of freedom ==
The bishop saw in the Austro-Russian military alliance against the Turks, the possibility and opportunity for the Serbian people to be liberated and rescued. His aspirations coincided with the interests of the Habsburg monarchy, which wanted to attract Serbs in the Belgrade pashalik to its side during the upcoming war. At the end of December 1787, he sent a petition to the Austrian ruler, asking for permission to visit and reconnoitre the Turkish border. Bishop Jovan, with the consent of Emperor Joseph II, went (from 7 April 1788) to Serbia to raise the people against the Turks, and took care of the Serbian emigrants in Austria. During Kočina Krajina in 1788, he travelled through the Serbian regions of Posavina and the Danube region, during an insurgent mission. He emphasized the idea of uniting all Serbs, as he pointed out in a memoir addressed to the Russian tsar. The First Serbian Uprising under the leadership of Karađorđe helped financially. A copper engraving with the image of Bishop Jovanović and a panorama of the town of Šabac was preserved from that time. At the bottom of the copperplate is engraved the inscription: Let us go, Bishop Svit. The Viennese court awarded him the Order of Saint Stephen for war merits. At the same time, for more than a decade, Bishop Jovanović suffered constant disputes, slander and attacks, due to his libertarian aspirations and pro-Russian attitude. Leader Karađorđe later addressed him in a letter from 1804: Serbian father, that you sang Serbia with your words, and even today that spirit is still in our hearts. It was an expressed gratitude to the patriotic pastor who managed to send two cannons(the church's great prangija) to Karađorđe's People's Army in the first years of the war.

== Criticism ==
Manojlo Grbić in "Karlovac Bishopric" (book 3, pp. 47–54) states that the previous bishop Petar Petrović, who defended the clergy from the authorities, was transferred to Arad without his will, and the state authorities were in a hurry to appoint the new bishop. Bishop Jovan was hated by the clergy and the people, because, with the assistance of the state, he tried to bring order among the disobedient lower clergy. Grbić commented on that with the words:

When the bishops were broken by the Declaration, it was now necessary to find a bishop who would break the priests as well, and then subordinate them with everything and hand them over to the supervision of the border military authorities. He flattered the authorities, so much so that he complained that Orthodox women carried a lot of gold and silver money with them, like jewelry. The government, although satisfied with his loyalty, does not allow the national costumes to be changed, so that it would not cause a revolt among the people. He also ceded to the generals the appointment of priests to parishes (as in place of the mentally ill Kirinian protege), which they had long aspired to. Because of all that, his successor Genadije Dimović also had great troubles.

== See also ==
- Stefan Tronoški (1759–1799), archimandrite of Tronoša
- Hadži-Ruvim (1752–1804), archimandrite of Bogovađa
- Stefan Stratimirović (1757–1836), bishop of Karlovci
