= Stefan Tronoški =

Serbian Orthodox monk

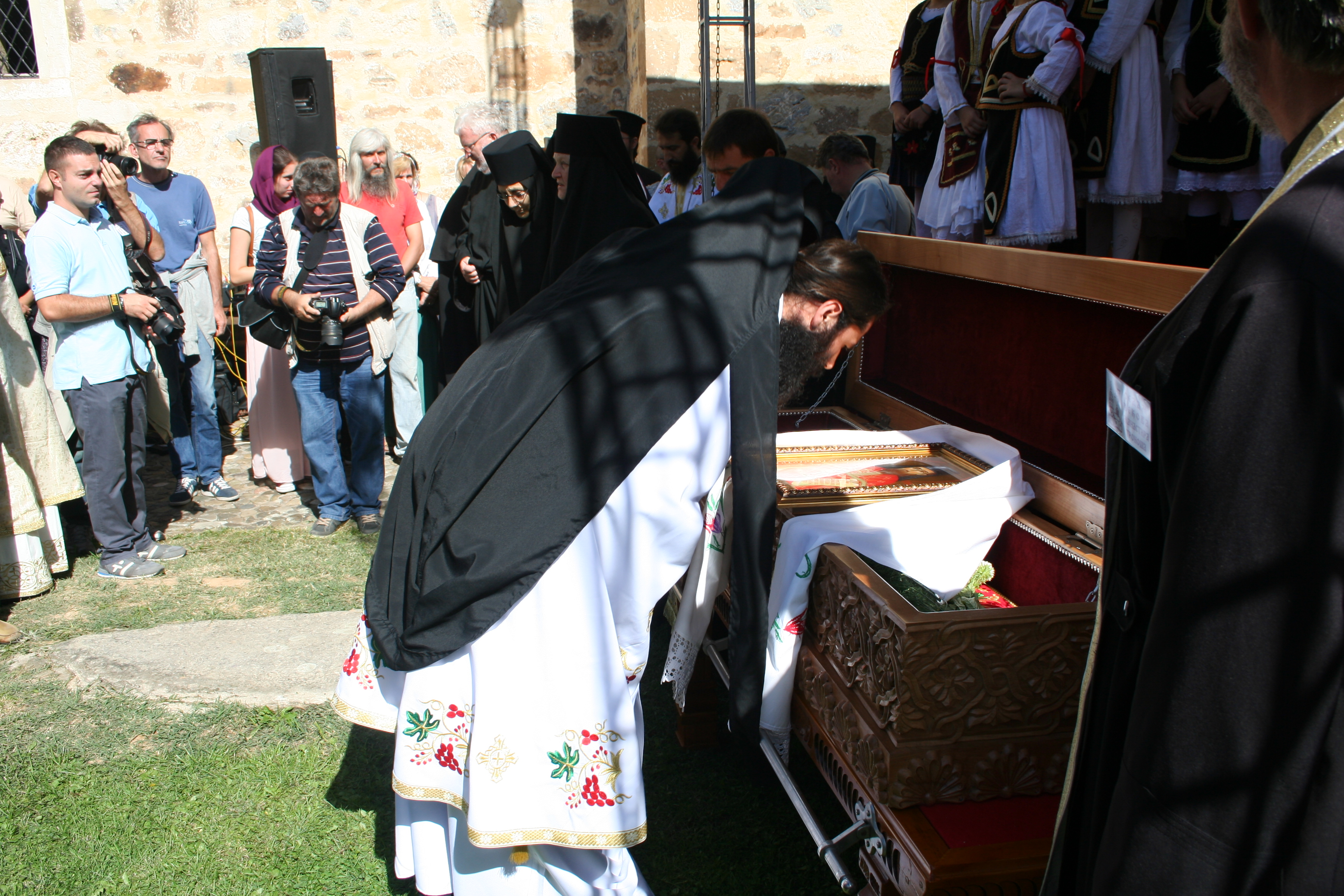
- Celebration of 700 years of the Tronoša Monastery, with Stefan Tronoški's relics.

Orders
- Rank: hegumen, archimandrite

Personal details
- Born: Stevan Jovanović; 1759 Tekeriš
- Died: 1799 (aged 39–40) Zvornik, Bosnia Eyalet
- Buried: Tronoša Monastery
- Denomination: Eastern Orthodox
- Residence: Tronoša Monastery

Sainthood
- Feast day: 17 September
- Venerated in: Serbian Orthodox Church
- Title as Saint: Venerable
- Canonized: 2017

Stefan Tronoški (Serbian: Стефан Троношки; 1759–1799) was a Serb Orthodox monk and archimandrite (monastery supervisor) who organized the Serb people in the Belgrade Pashalik during the Austro-Turkish War (1788–1791). He was a proponent of Serbian autonomy following Austrian retreat, which the Serbs partly received in the Pashalik in 1793–94. While amnestied, his war-time activities compromised him and he retreated to monastic life at Tronoša Monastery, where he had taken monastic vows and served as archimandrite. He was poisoned in 1799 when he asked the Pasha of the neighbouring sanjak for food during a hunger. He was declared a saint in 2017.

== Life ==
Born as Stevan Jovanović (Стеван Јовановић) in Tekeriš near Loznica in the Jadar region, he was educated and took monastic vows at the Tronoša Monastery, where he became an archimandrite at a young age.

Tronoški was active during the Austro-Turkish War (1788–1791). He had joined the Austrian preparations to rally the Serb people against the Ottomans and fight for liberation, and helped in organizing volunteers in the Serbian Free Corps. He was known for stressing unity, to look past any disagreements and misunderstandings, as the only way to be strong and able to stand up to the enemy. In 1790 the Austrian army retreated and peace was sought, which panicked the Serbs that had fought for the Austrians, leading to many refugees. The Serbs had military successes, on their own, in central Serbia, and thus were victims of persecution. On 22 January 1790 archimandrite Stefan Tronoški gathered Serb leaders at Tronoša to petition the Austrian emperor for aid. On 4 August 1790 he asked the Austrian commissary in Temeswar to not abandon the Serbs and on 24 August himself attended the Serb national assembly in the town and represented 119 notables from Serbia. On 23 September Austria and the Porte signed a truce, which disappointed Stefan, who travelled to Vienna and petitioned there. After February 1791 he was forced to flee to Srem, where he received a meagre 200 forints for his war-time service. Another petition was made, with hierarchs and leaders, that asked that Austria take their Serb allies in consideration during peace talks; amnesty was sought, and autonomy through economic- and administrative rights on the basis of the Russian-secured Danubian Principalities, with a Serb governor ("commander"). The Austrians stopped Stefan from taking the petition also to the Sistova talks.

Stefan was appointed the main organizer of settlement of Serbs in Austria, as per Viennese decision made on 22 April 1791. He was however removed from this by the Metropolitan of Belgrade, the Greek Dionysios, who wanted to gain merit with the Austrians. After July 1791 Stefan decided to return to Serbia, and informed the Illyrian Chancellery that he chose this as "that the Austrian court ceded back to the Turks poor Serbia and rejected the people". With the Austro-Turkish peace, massive flight of Serbs across the Sava to Habsburg territory ensued. The Porte decided to offer the Serbs who stayed similar rights that they received in Austria, including a three-year exemption of taxes. The Serbs received amnesty with the Treaty of Sistova, but the loss of property was not addressed. Stefan retreated to monastery life as he was compromised due to his war-time work.

In 1793–1794, the Serbs of the Belgrade Pashalik received rights in line with Stefan's earlier petition, including rural autonomy, security, fixed taxes with independent collection, the separation of sipahi and Turks from villages, and serious repercussions for violence and revenge on the Christian rayah. In 1796, Vuk Karadžić, the later philologist, studied at the monastery. During the great hunger of 1799, Stefan went to Zvornik and asked the Pasha of the Sanjak of Zvornik to give him the stale food that was held in the fortress towers, and promised to return it after the harvest. The Pasha, mistrusting him for being an Austrian agent, instead had him poisoned. His body was buried beside the Tronoša monastery.

Vuk Karadžić wrote a three-page biography on him in the Danica magazine in 1898. Stefan Tronoški was proclaimed a saint of the Serbian Orthodox Church in 2017 due to his love for his people, selfless sacrifice and martyrdom.

== See also ==
- Jovan Jovanović (1732–1805), bishop of Bačka
- Hadži-Ruvim (1752–1804), archimandrite of Bogovađa
- Stefan Stratimirović (1757–1836), bishop of Karlovci
- Antim Zepos (1762–1814), bishop of Užice-Valjevo

== Sources ==
- Srdanović-Barać, Olga (1980). "Троношки архимандрит Стеван Јовановић (1759—1799): Родољубље и историјска улога у време Кочине Крајине". Теолошки Погледи. XIII (4). Свети Архијерејски Синод: 237–250.
- Milovanović, Jovana (2025-09-18). "Episkop Jerotej: Sveti Stefan Tronoški je sledio pastirski put Pastironačalnika Hrista". Politika Online (in Serbian).
- Tošić, Saša (2024-12-05). "PROSLAVA VAVEDENJA PORED MOŠTIJU SVECA KOGA SU TURCI OTROVALI: Svedočanstvo iz manastira Tronoša, koje inspiriše i opominje". Religija Republika (in Serbian).
