= Erdevik =

Erdevik Ердевик (Serbian) Erdevík (Slovak)
- Village (Selo)
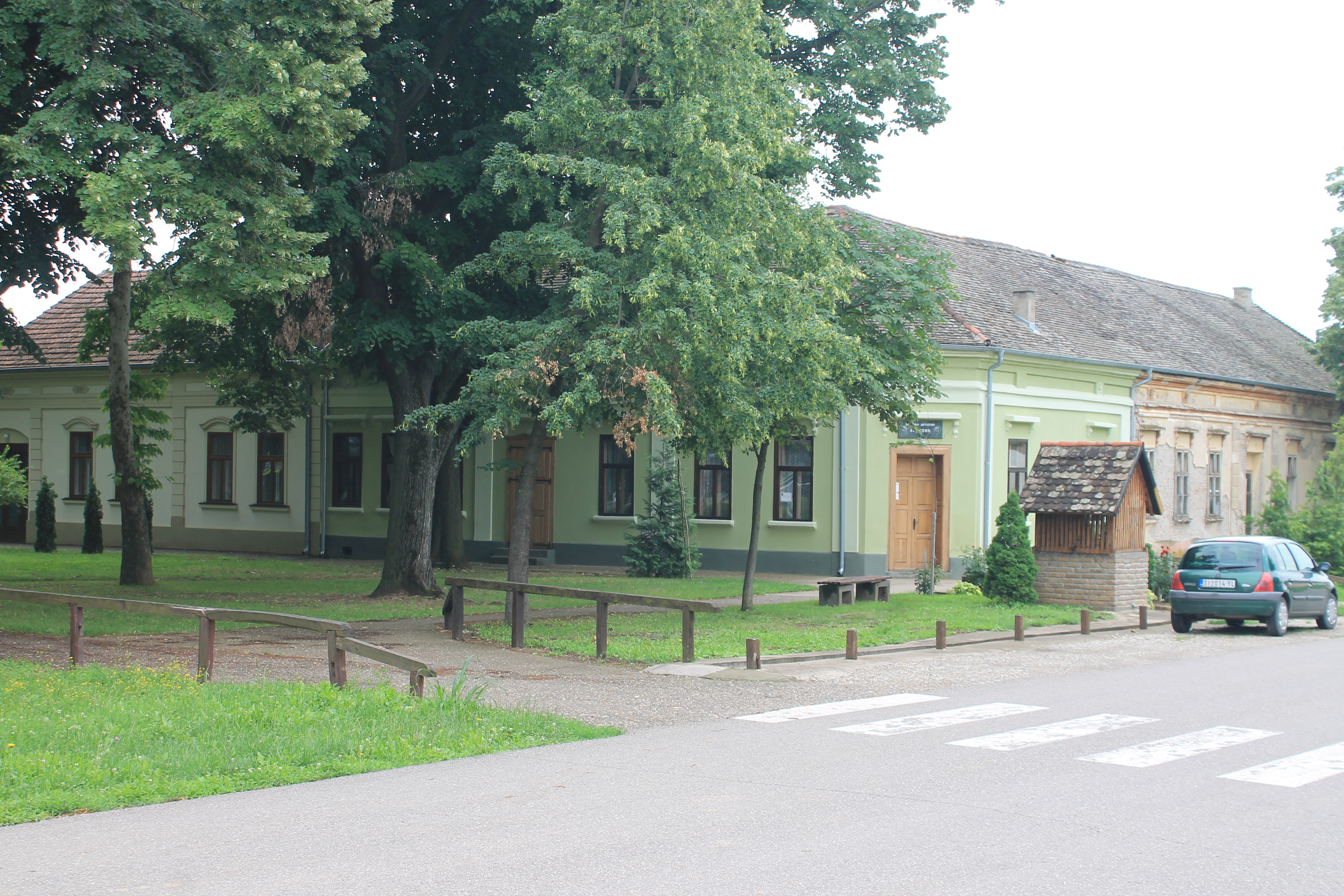
- Main street in Erdevik

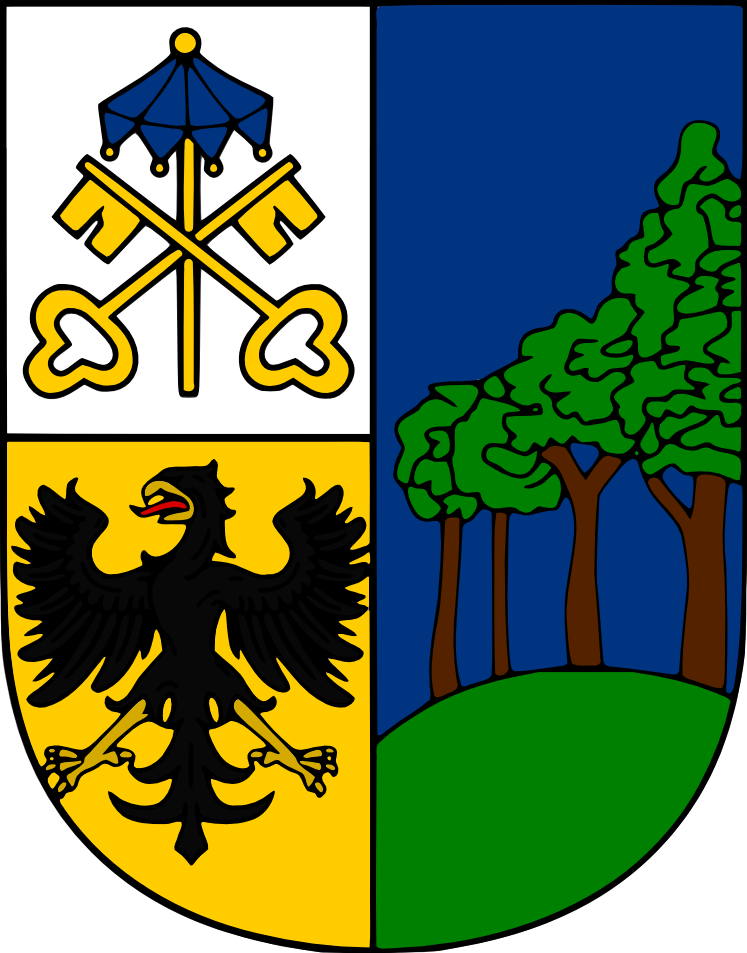
- Seal

- Location within Vojvodina Location within Serbia Location within Europe
- Coordinates: 45°07′N 19°24′E
- Country: Serbia
- Province: Vojvodina
- Region: Syrmia
- District: Srem
- Municipality: Šid

Area
  - Total: 63.90 km^{2} (24.67 sq mi)
- Elevation: 121 m (397 ft)

Population (2011)
  - Total: 2,736
  - Density: 42.82/km^{2} (110.9/sq mi)
- Time zone: UTC+1 (CET)
  - Summer (DST): UTC+2 (CEST)

Erdevik (Serbian Cyrillic: Ердевик; pronounced [ɛrdɛ̌ʋiːk]) is a village located in the municipality of Šid, Srem District, Vojvodina, Serbia. As of 2011 census, it has a population of 2,736 inhabitants.

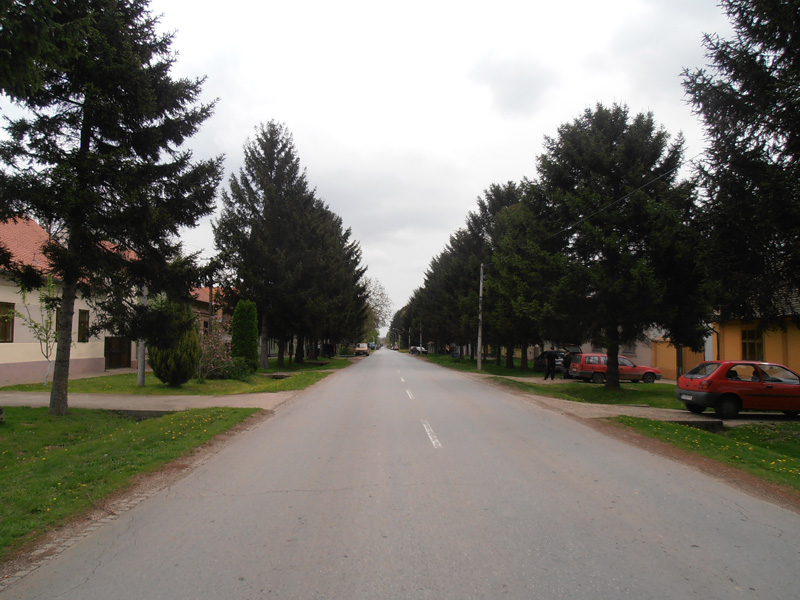
Main street in Erdevik

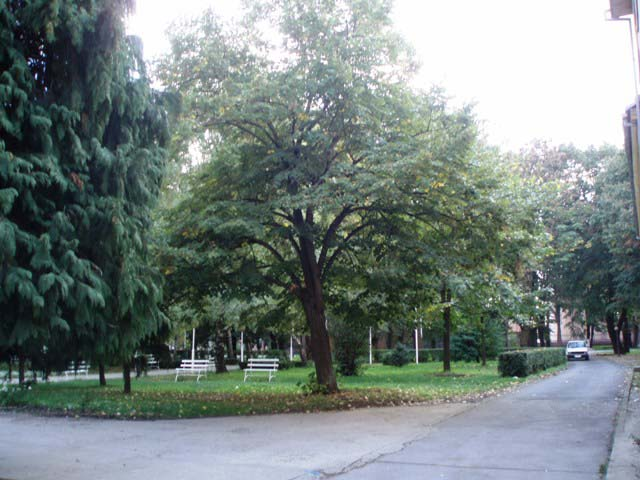
Park in Erdevik

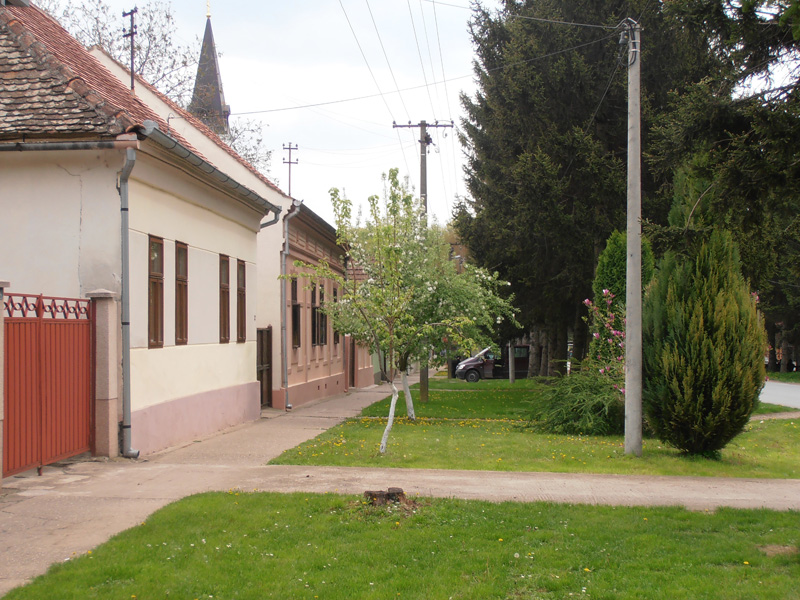
Lenjin street in Erdevik

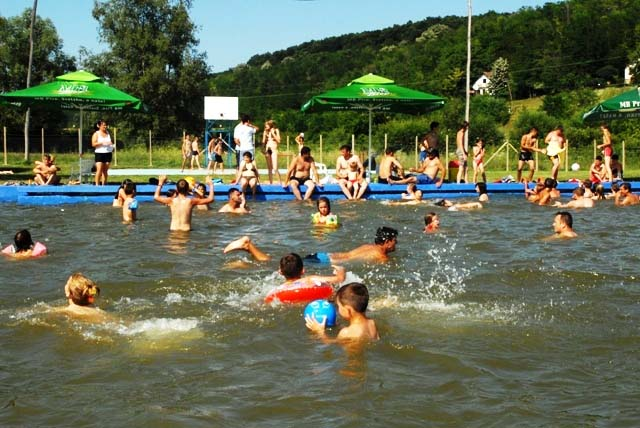
Pool in Erdevik

== History ==
Following Ottoman retreat from the region, the Lordship of Ilok and Upper Syrmia was established, and the village became part of its domain.

== Demographics ==
=== Historical population ===
- 1931: 4,869
- 1961: 4,499
- 1971: 4,177
- 1981: 3,758
- 1991: 3,427
- 2002: 3,316
- 2011: 2,736

=== Ethnic groups ===
The ethnic groups in the village as of 2002 census:

- Serbs = 2,007 (60.53%)
- Slovaks = 846 (25.51%)
- Croats = 134 (4.04%)
- Hungarians = 95 (2.87%)
- Yugoslavs = 75 (2.26%)
- Rusyns = 23 (0.69%)
- others.

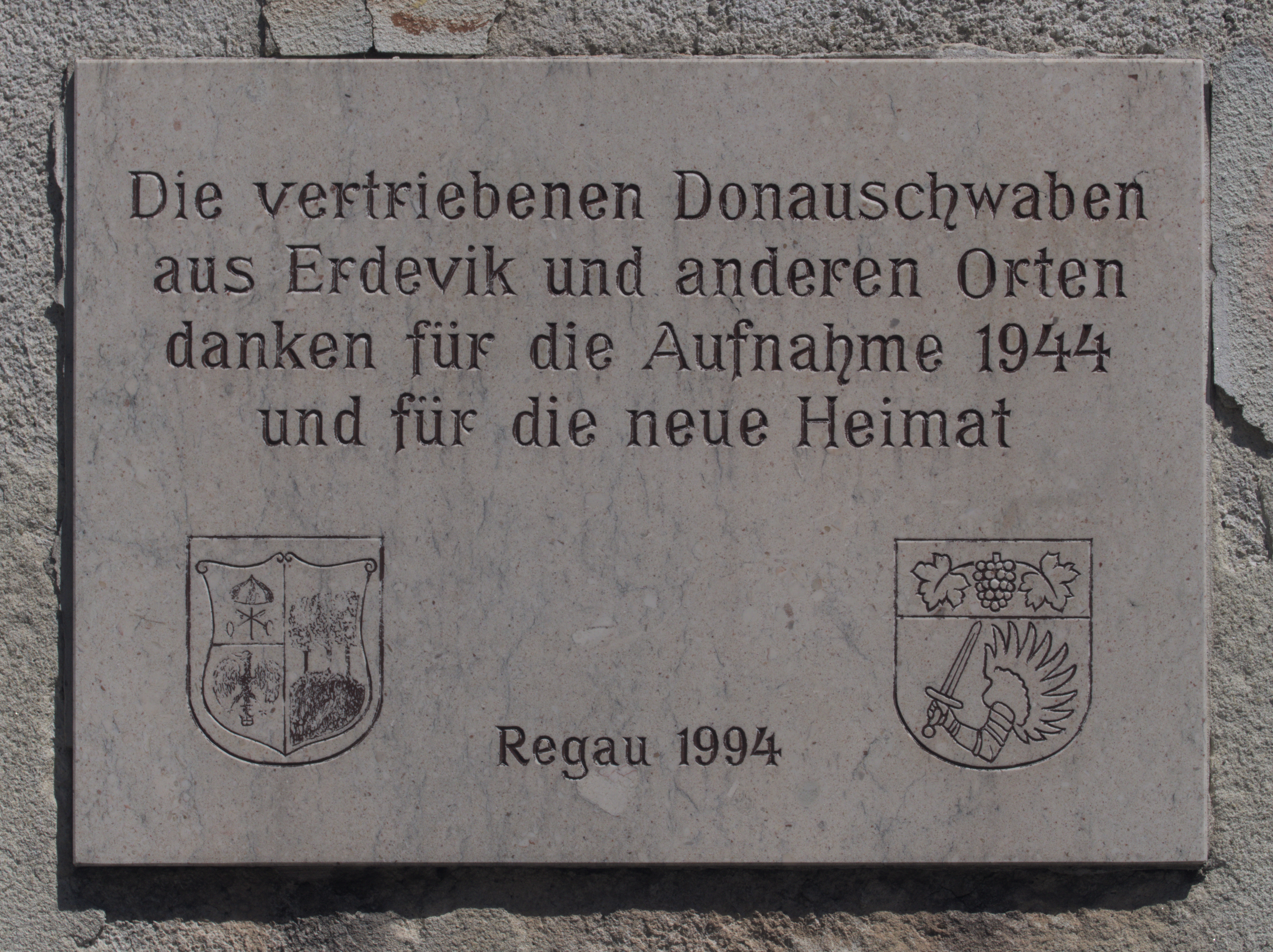
Memorial plaque in Upper Austria, remembering the Danube Swabians that once lived in Erdevik

== See also ==
- List of places in Serbia
- List of cities, towns and villages in Vojvodina
- Church of St. Nicholas, Erdevik
