= Tekeriš =

Coordinates: 44°33′26″N 19°31′47″E

Tekeriš Текериш (Serbian)
- Village (Selo)
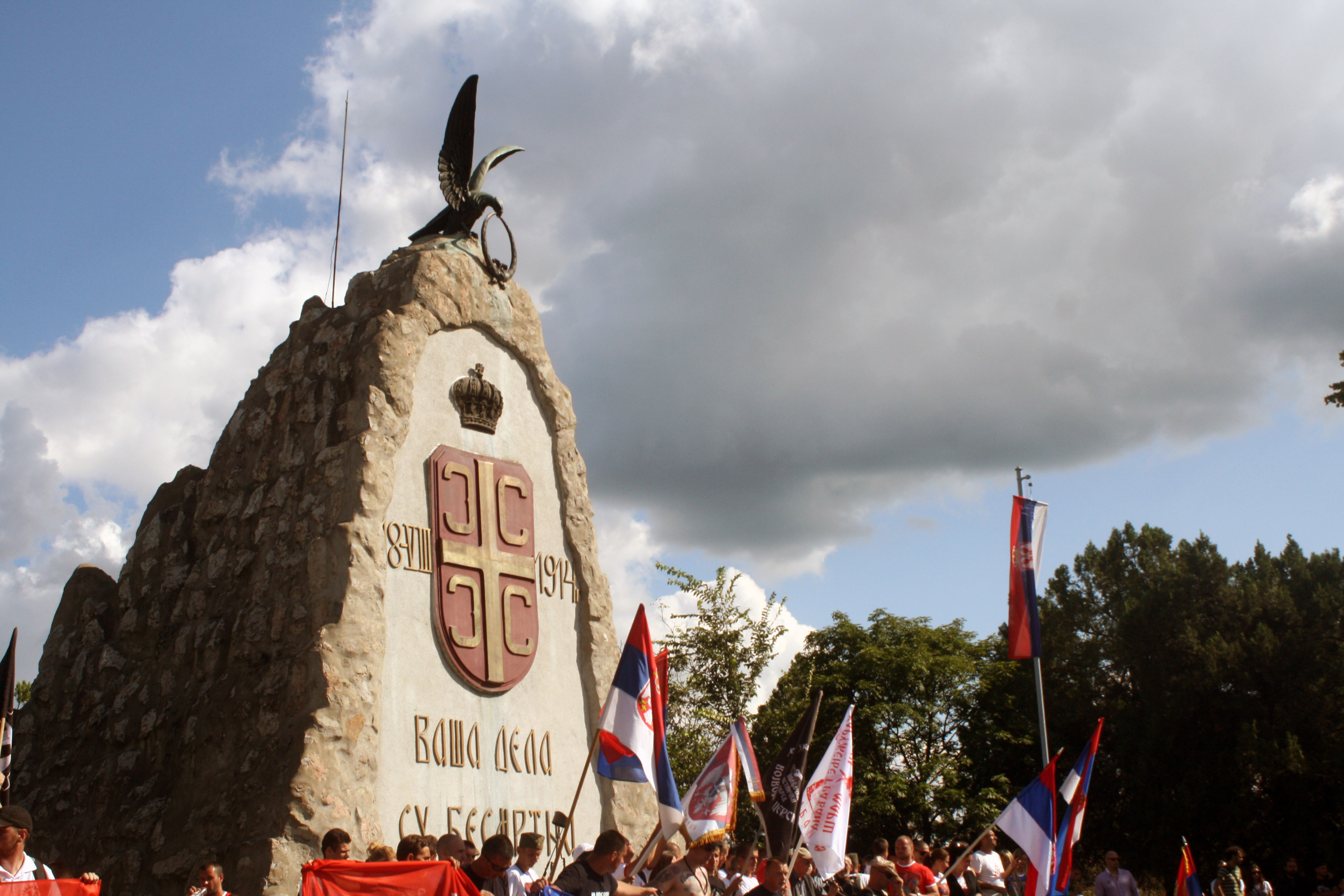
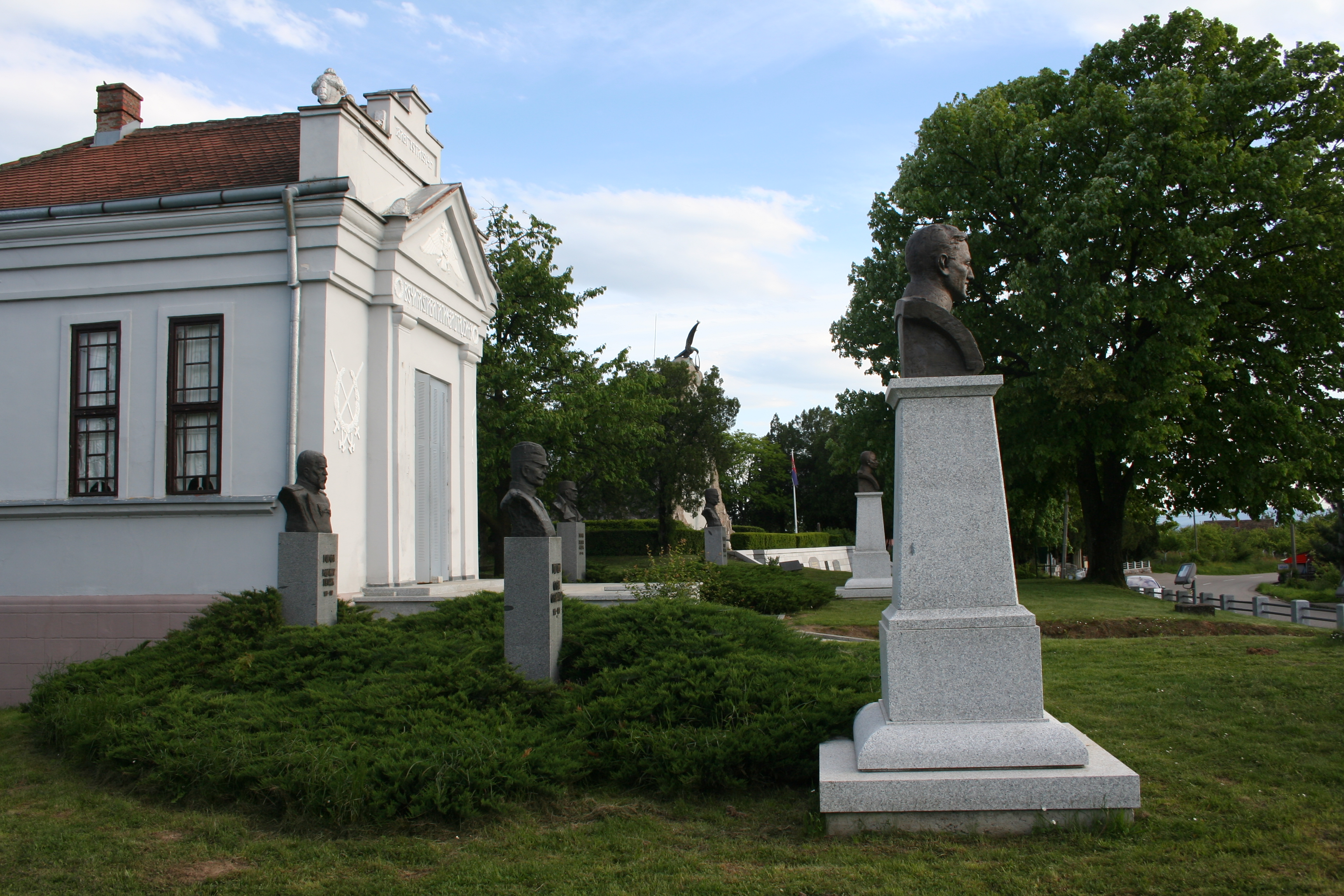
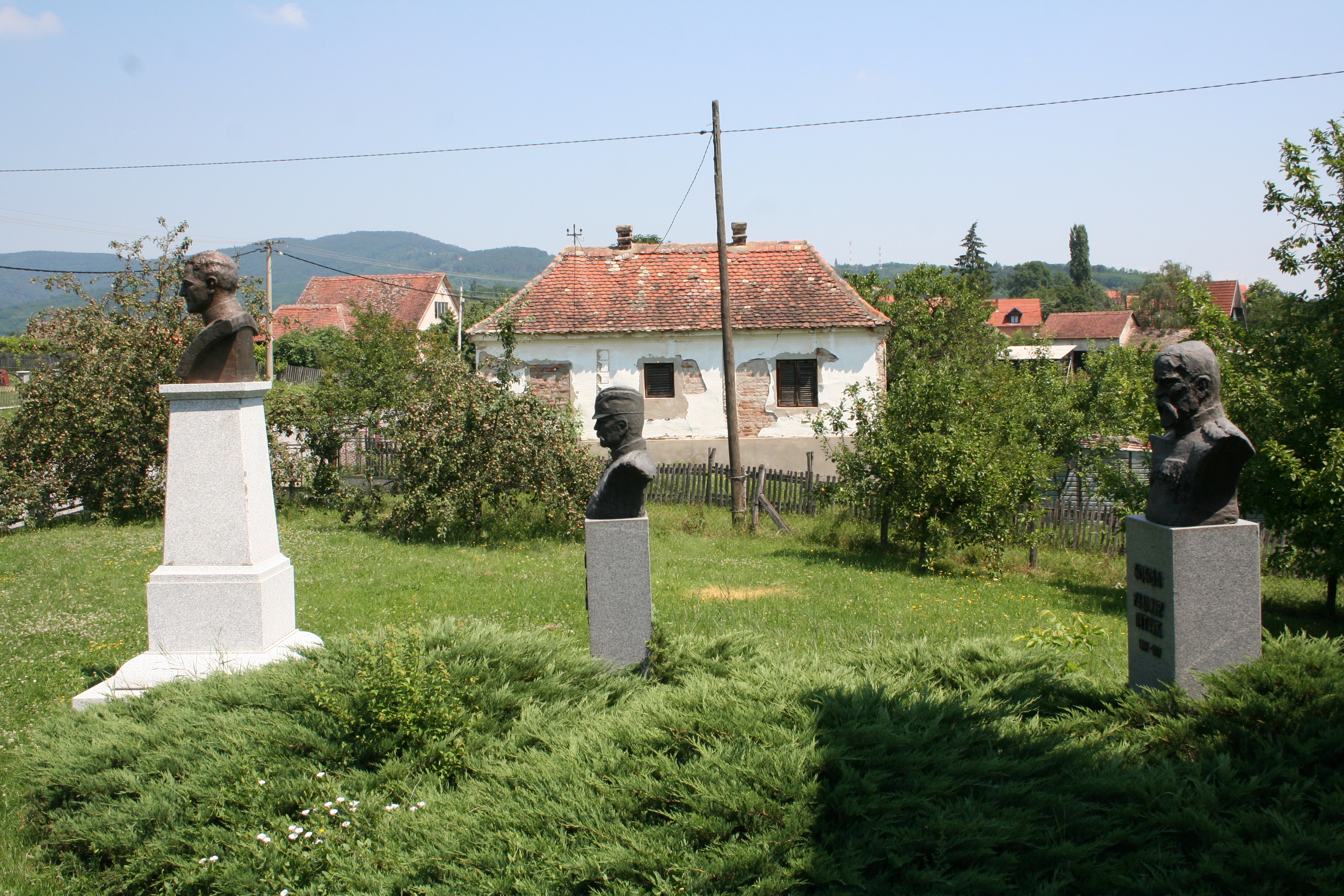
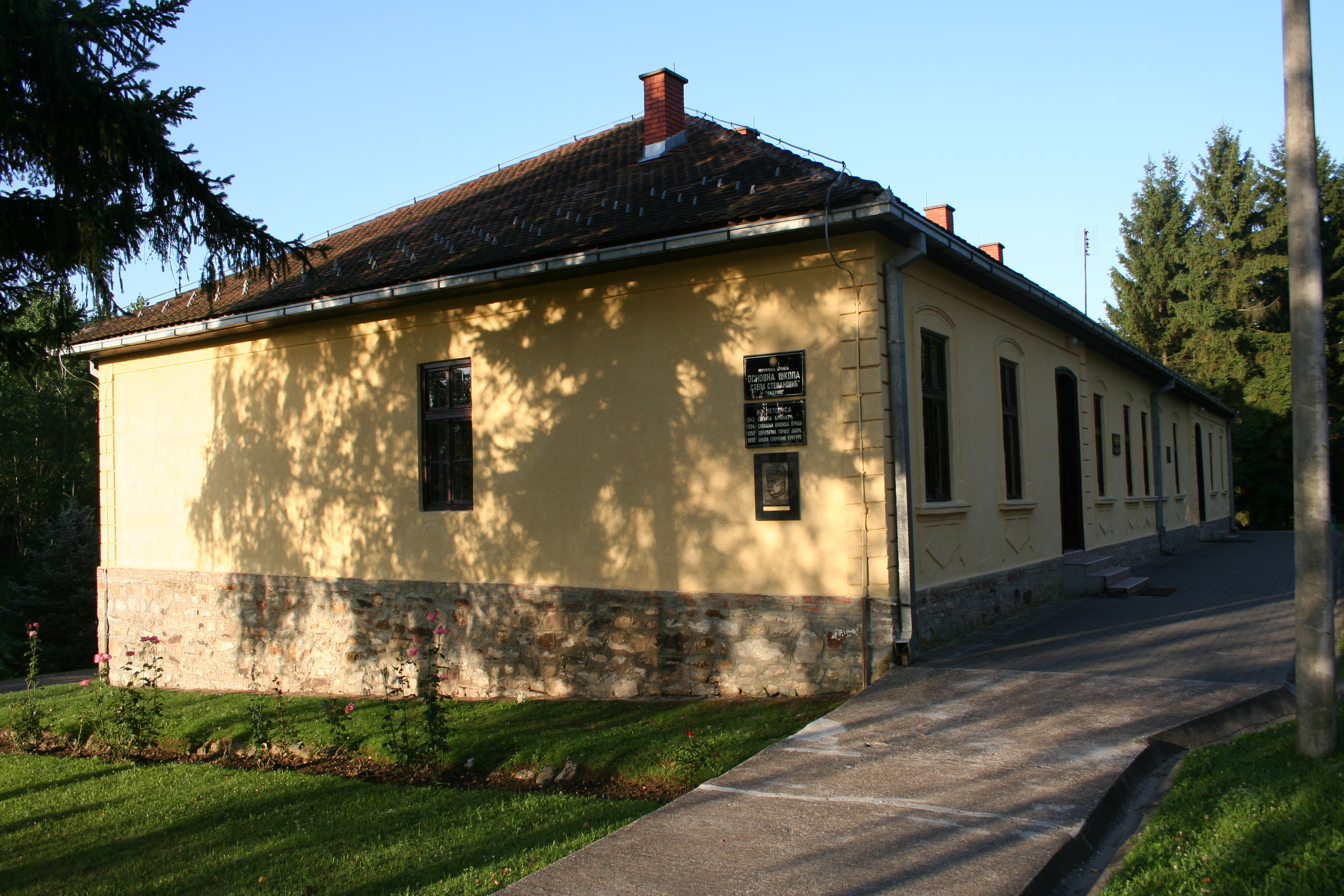
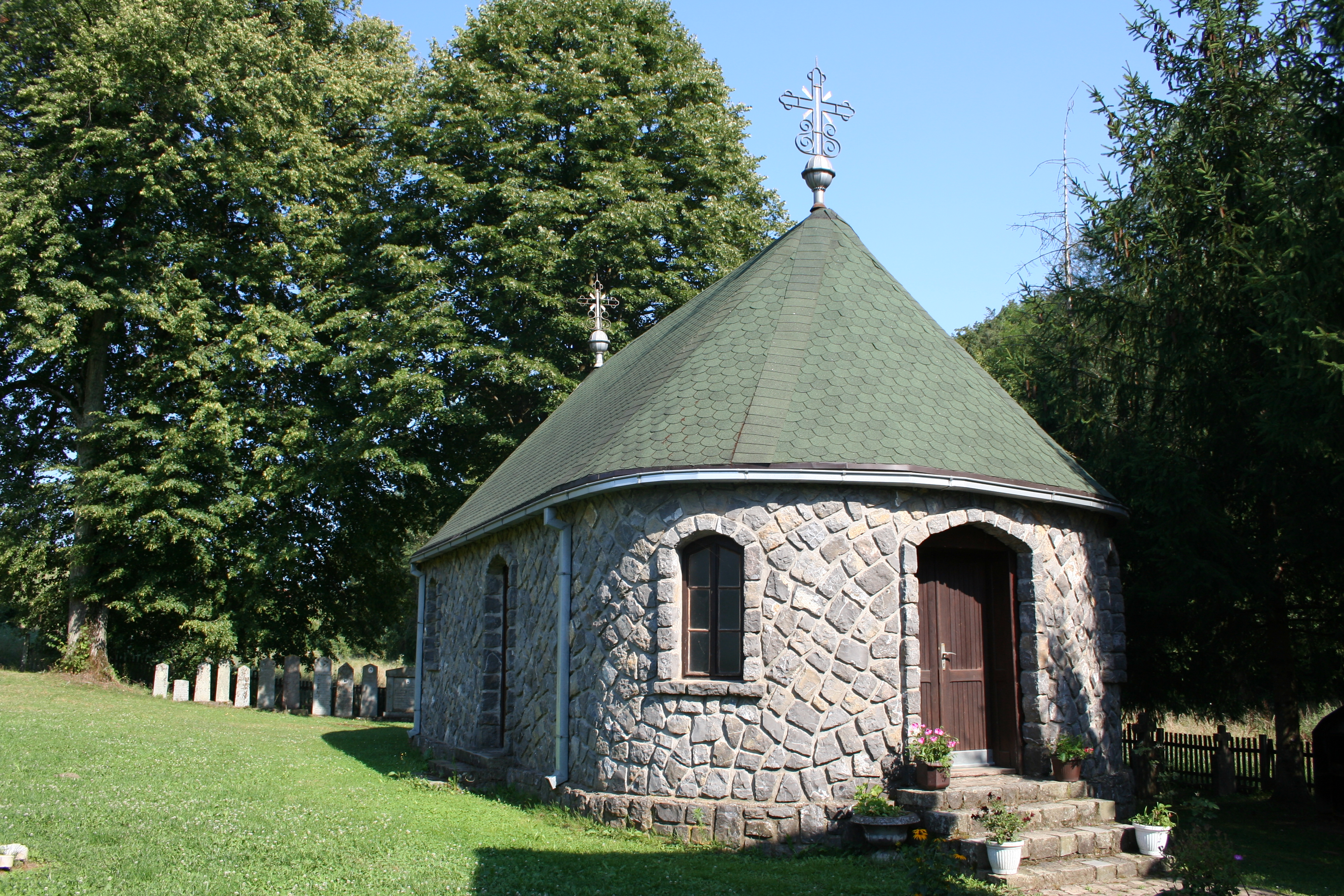
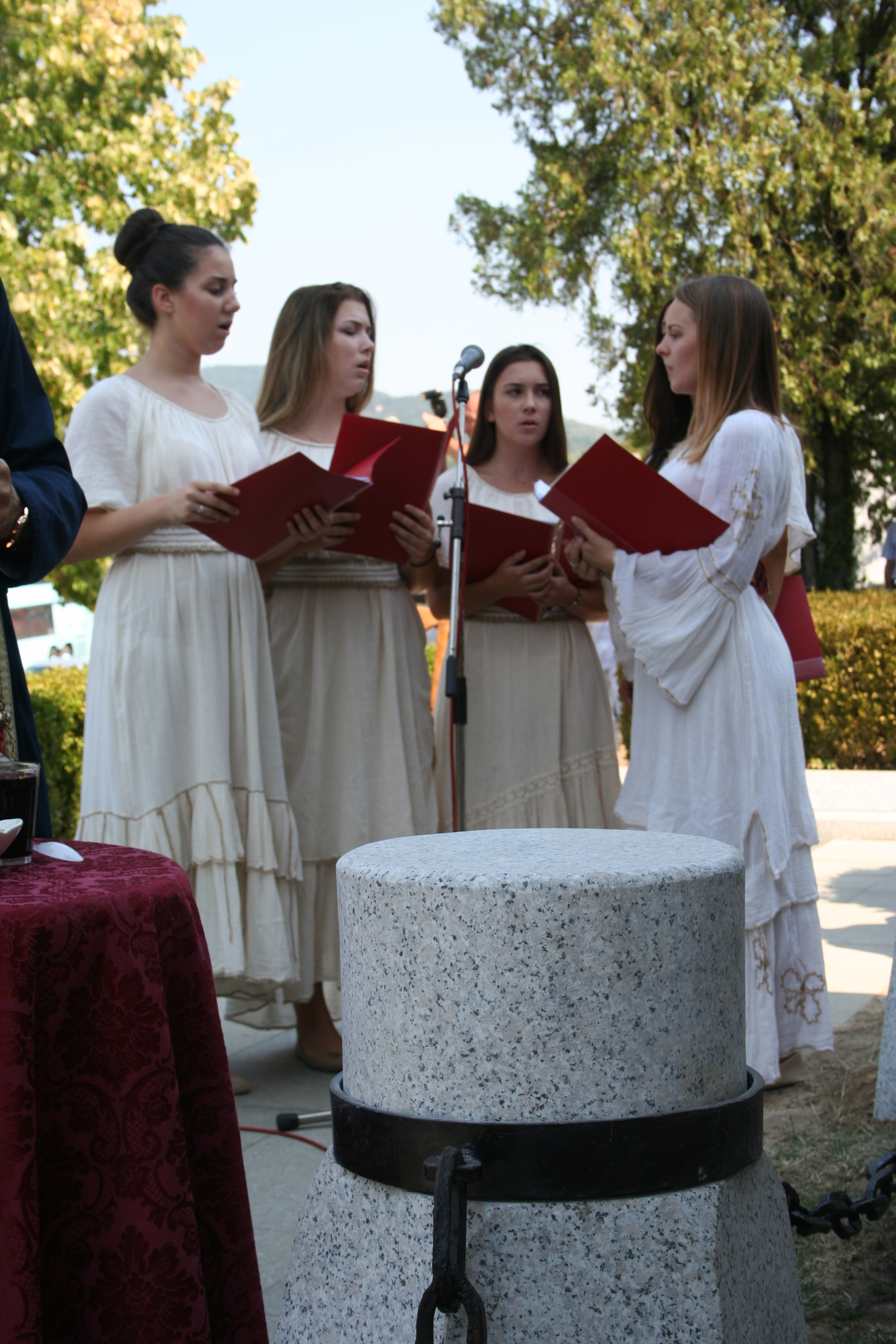
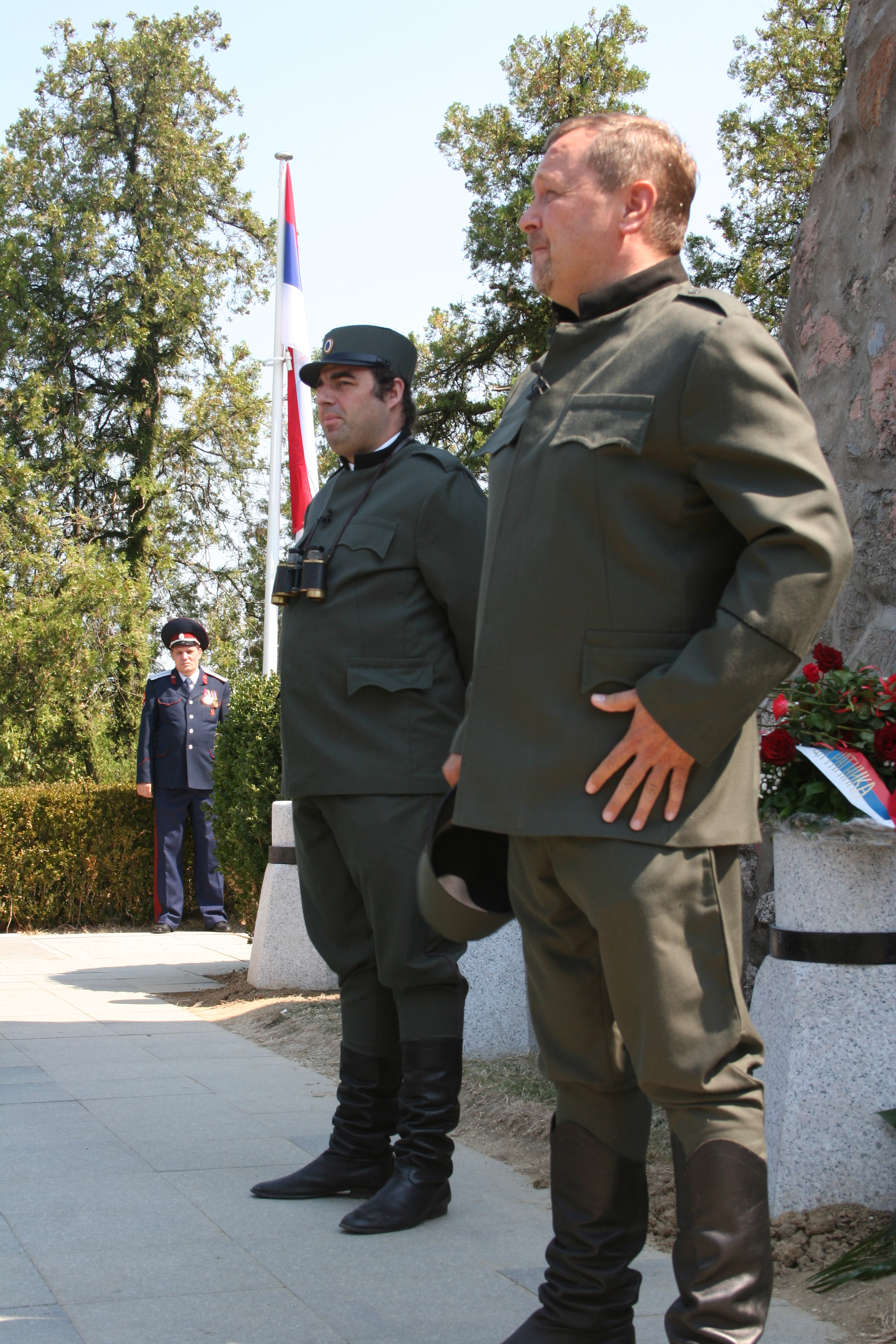
- Interactive map of Tekeriš
- Country: Serbia
- Time zone: UTC+1 (CET)
  - Summer (DST): UTC+2 (CEST)

Tekeriš (Serbian Cyrillic: Текериш) is a village in Serbia. It is situated in the Loznica municipality, in the Mačva District. This village has a Serbian ethnic majority and its population numbers 370 people, according to the 2002 census.

Tekeriš was the birth place of Stefan Tronoški (1759–1799), the archimandrite of the Tronoša Monastery. Tekeriš is famous because of the Battle of Cer that occurred here, which was the first allied victory in World War I.

== See also ==
- List of places in Serbia
