= Gensis =

Gensis may refer to:

- Gensis, the possible name of an ancient Roman town at Koviljkin grad, Serbia
- Gensis (vicus), an ancient Roman vicus in Moesia Superior

== See also ==
- Gensi (disambiguation)
