= Genesys =

Genesys may refer to:

- Genesys (company), a customer experience and contact center technology company
- Genesys (RPG), a tabletop role-playing game released by Fantasy Flight Games in 2017
- Genesys (video game), an educational video game released in 2000
- Genesys (website), a portal to information about plant genetic resources for food and agriculture
- Genesys, a brand of music synthesizers produced by Generalmusic
- Genesys Wealth Advisers or Avanti Racing Team, an Australian UCI Continental cycling team

== See also ==
- Timewyrm: Genesys (novel) 1991 Doctor Who story by John Peel
- Genesis (disambiguation)
- Genisys (disambiguation)
