= Jadar Museum =

- Музеј Јадра
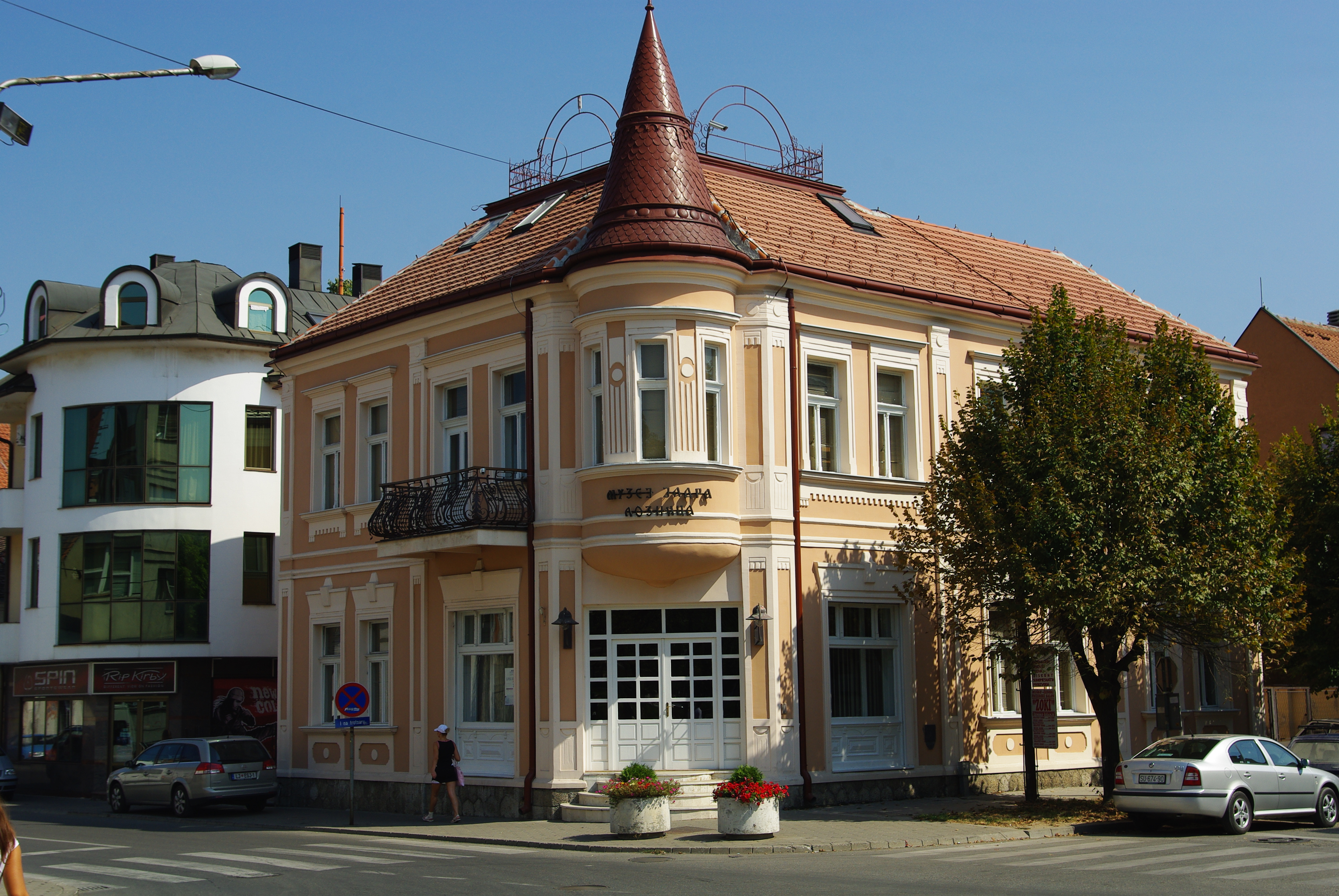
- The Old Pharmacy building which the museum is located in
- Established: 24 May 1984; 42 years ago
- Location: Pašićeva 25, 15300 Loznica, Serbia
- Coordinates: 44°31′53.8″N 19°13′28.628″E
- Type: History museum
- Website: ckvkaradzic.org.rs/cir/oj_muzej_jadra.html

The Jadar Museum (Serbian Cyrillic: Музеј Јадра) is a history museum located in Loznica, Serbia. It has a permanent collection dedicated to man's activities in the area of Podrinje from prehistory until 1950. The museum is housed in the Old Pharmacy Building, which is the cultural monument of great importance.

== History ==
The decision to create the museum was taken in 1984 by the Municipal assembly of Loznica, which decided on the building of "Old Pharmacy" to make it the city museum. The museum was opened on 14 September 1987 with a ceremony honoring two centuries of Vuk Stefanović Karadžić.

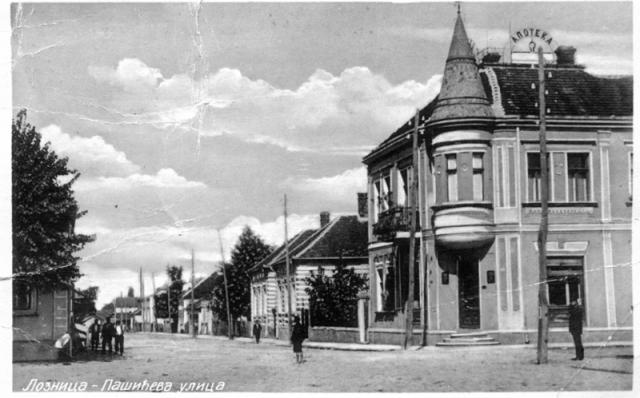
"Old Pharmacy"

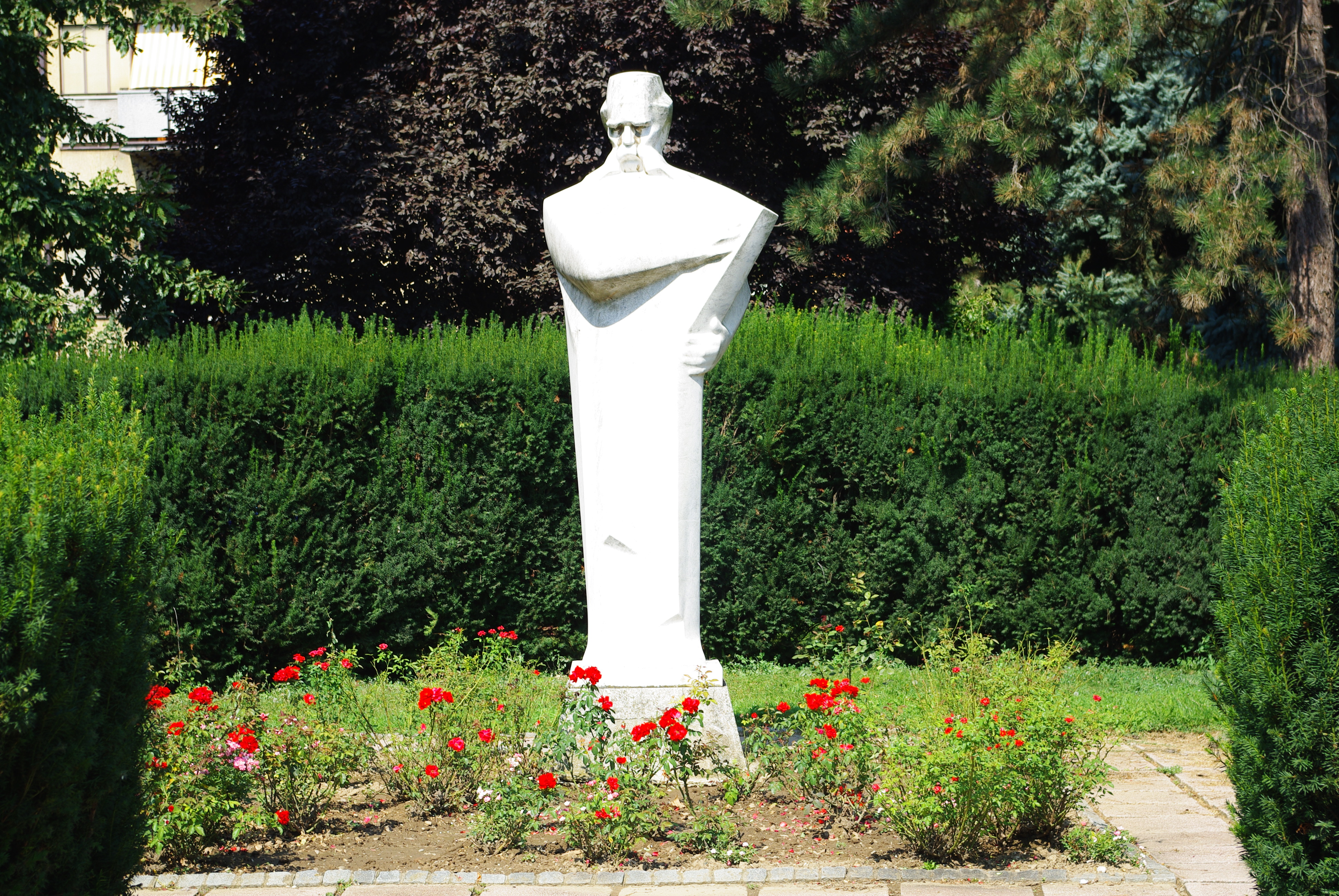
Statue of Vuk Stefanović Karadžić

== Exposition ==
Jadar Museum has a permanent collection dedicated to man's activities in the area of Loznica of prehistory until 1950. The setting is enriched with years and now has 171 archaeological objects, 410 ethnological, historical 516, 195 numismatic and more than 1500 documents and photos. In addition to the permanent exhibition at the Jadar Museum occasionally displayed temporary exhibitions, about 10 per year for 10 to 12 days.

== Gallery ==
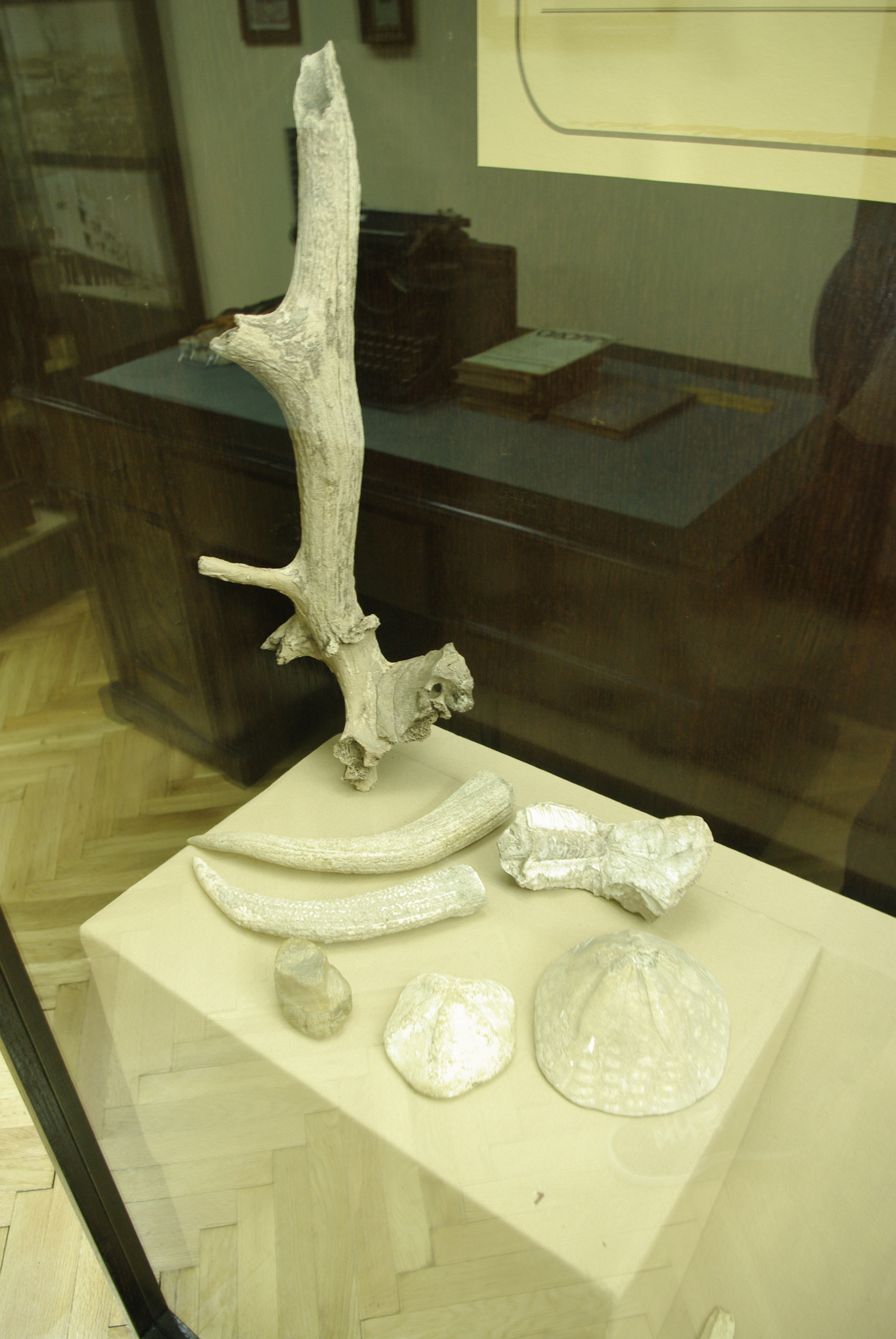

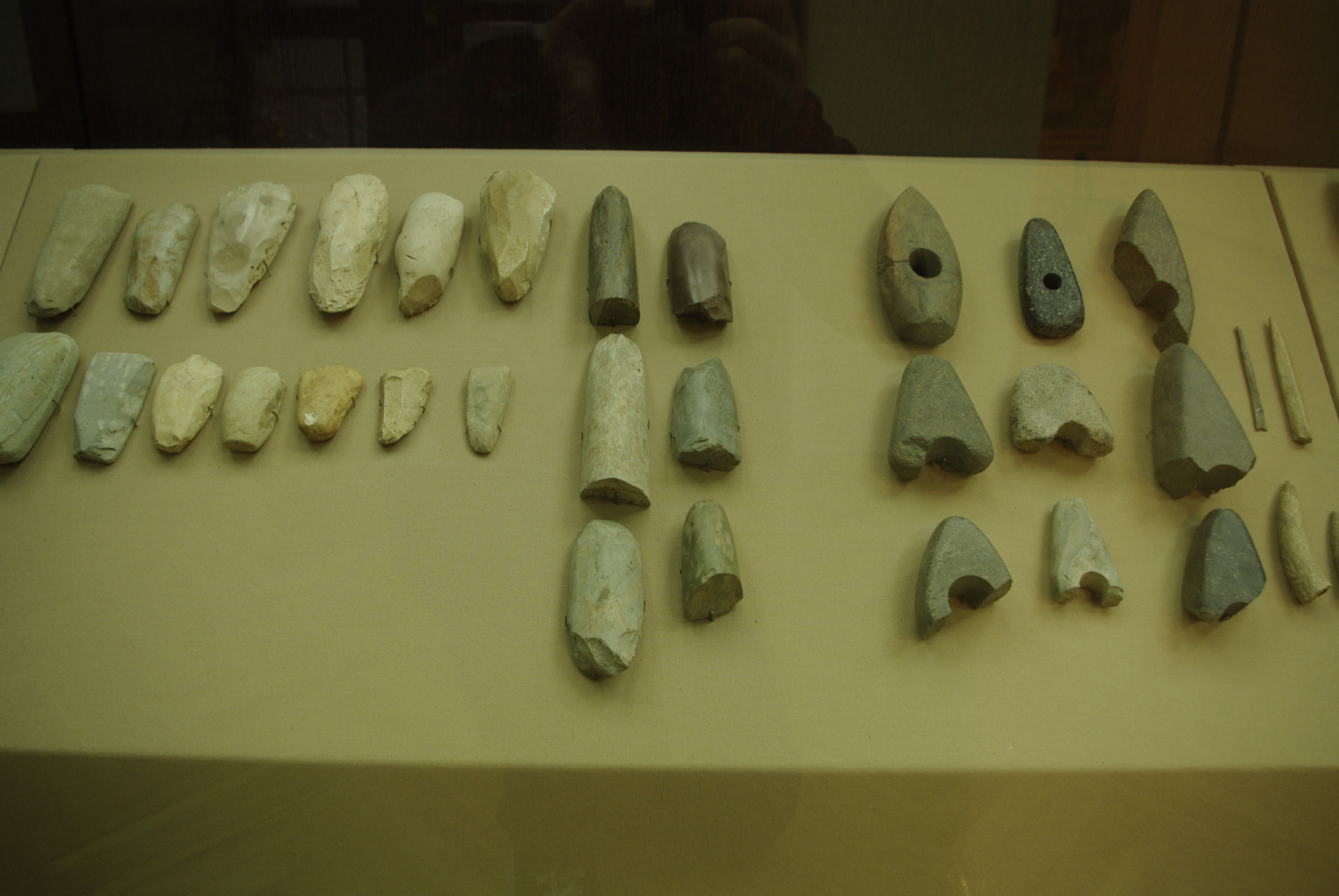

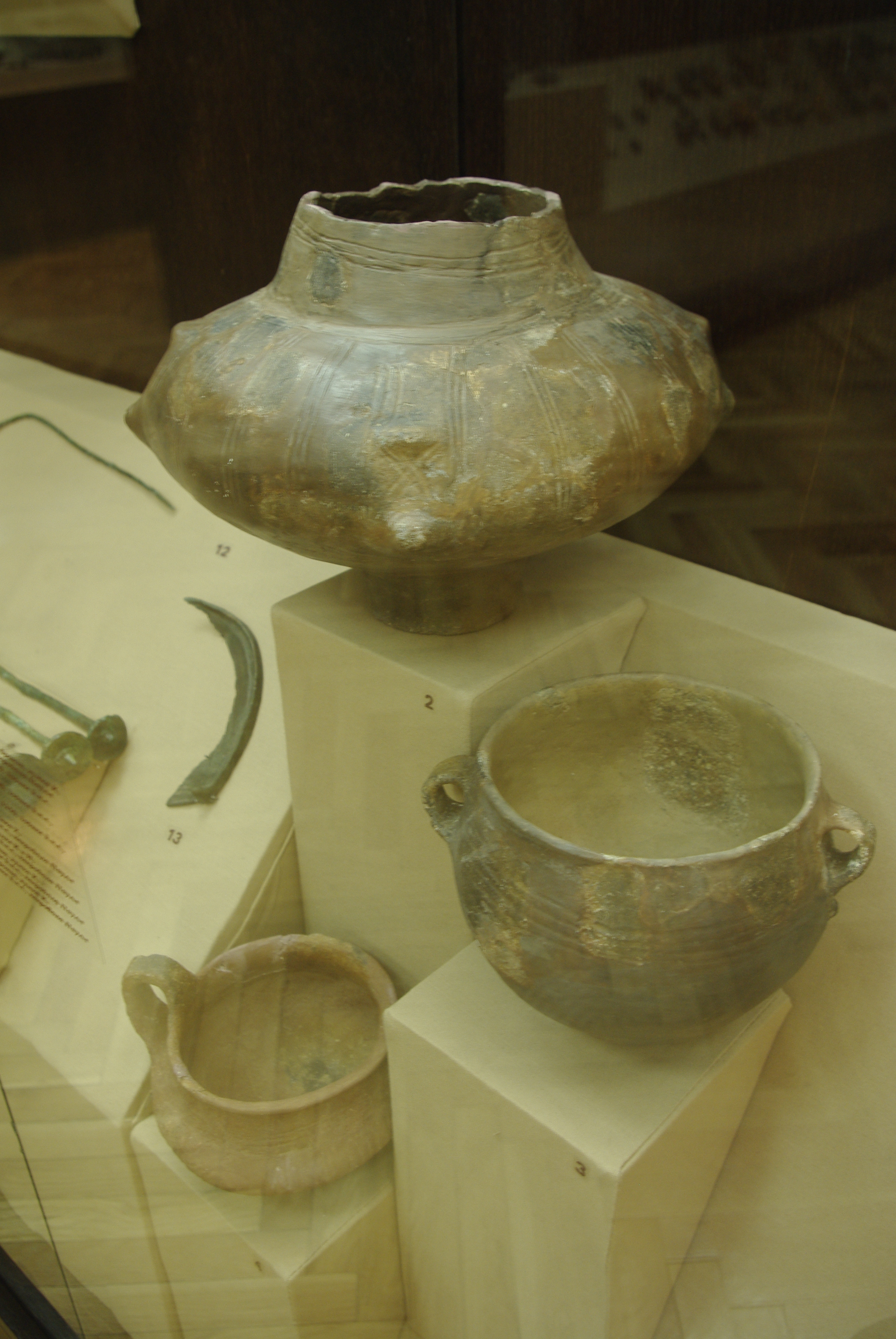

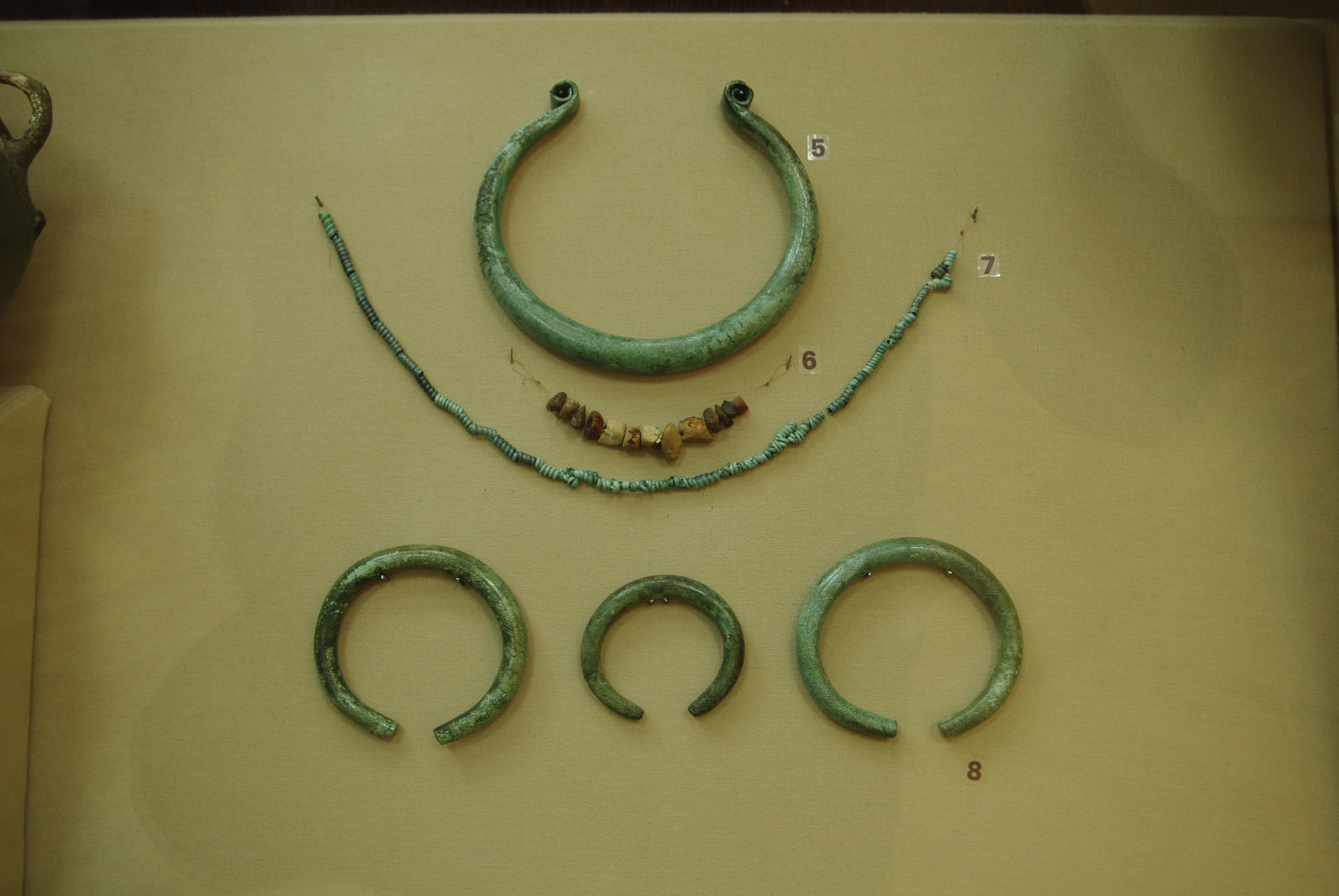

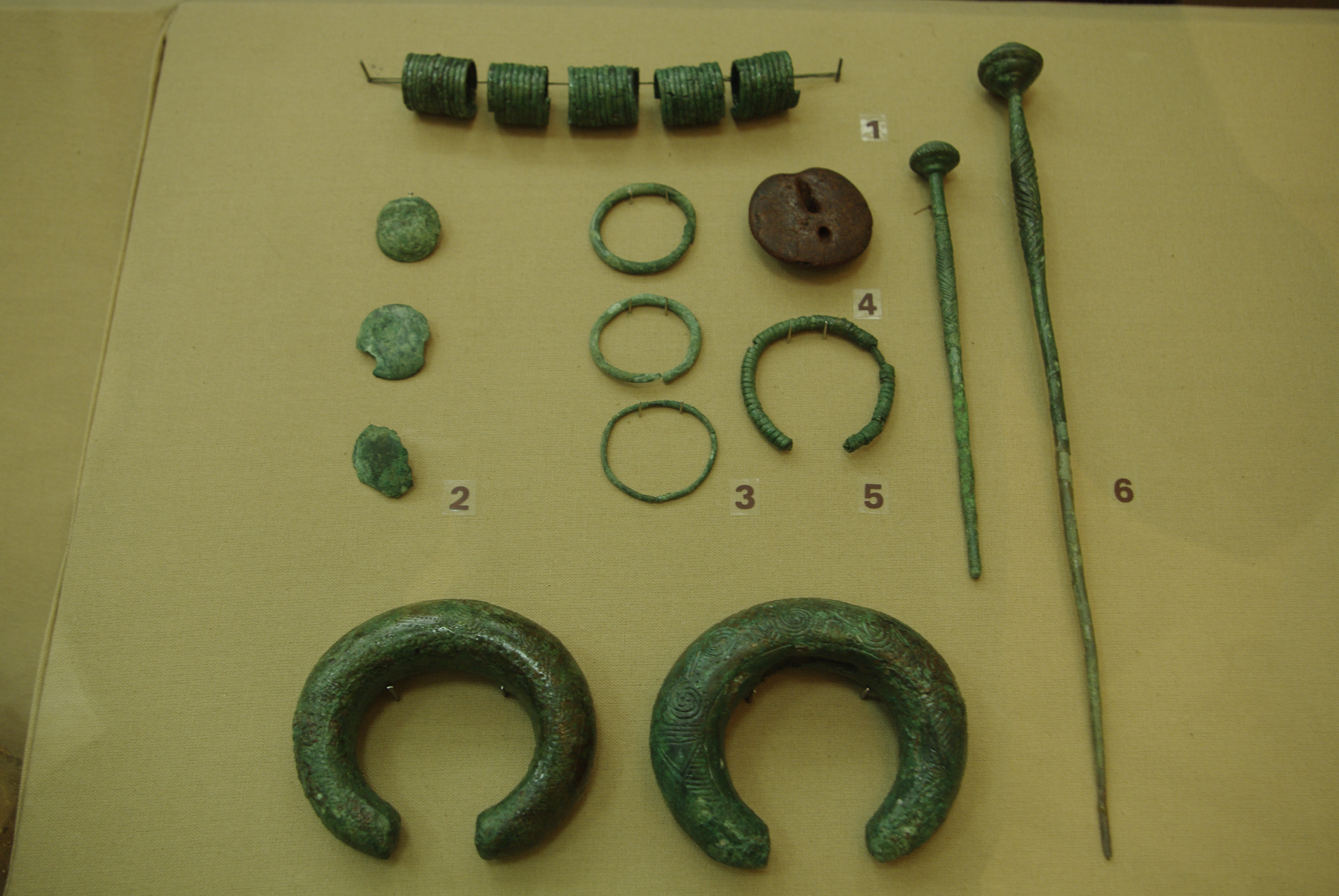

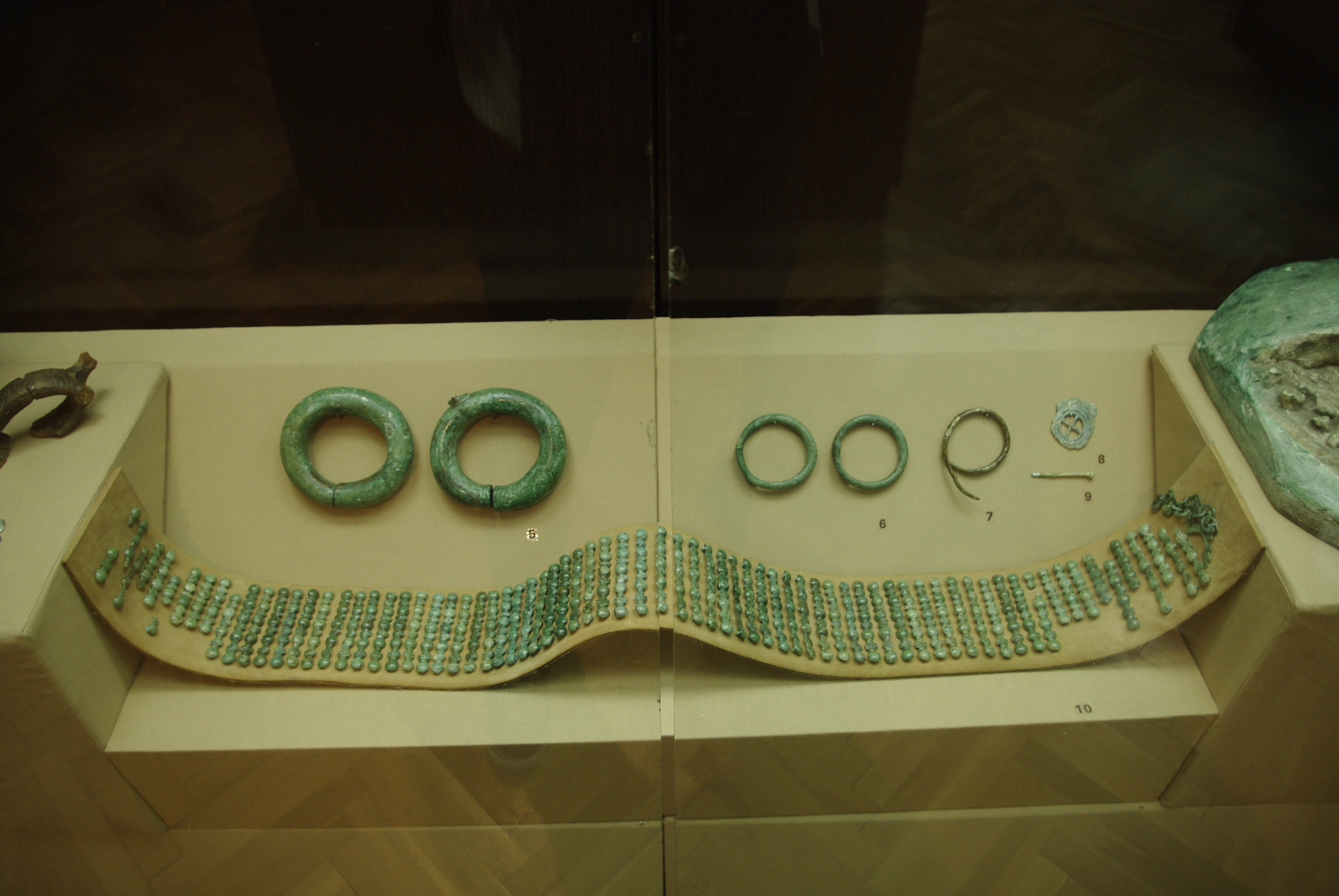

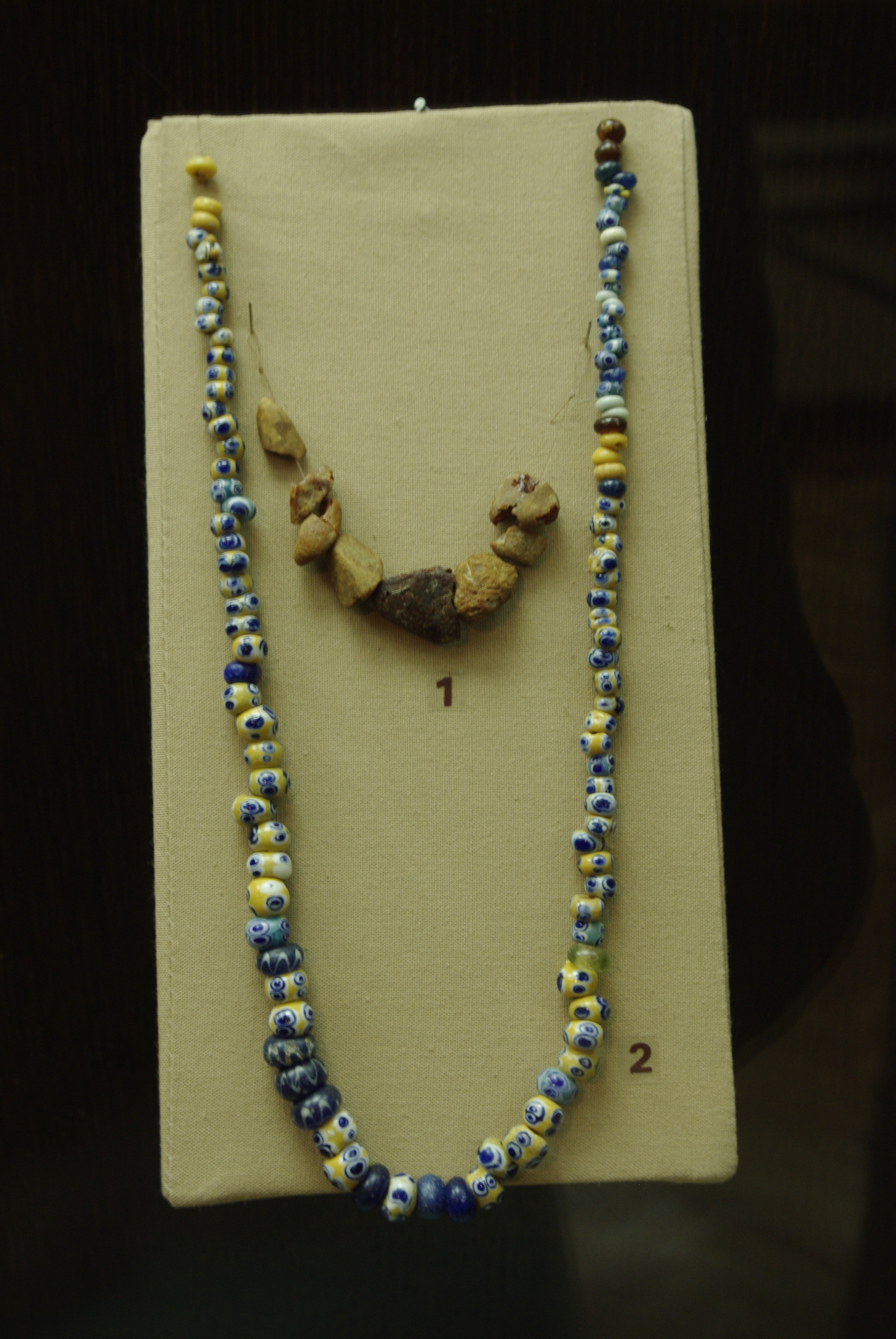

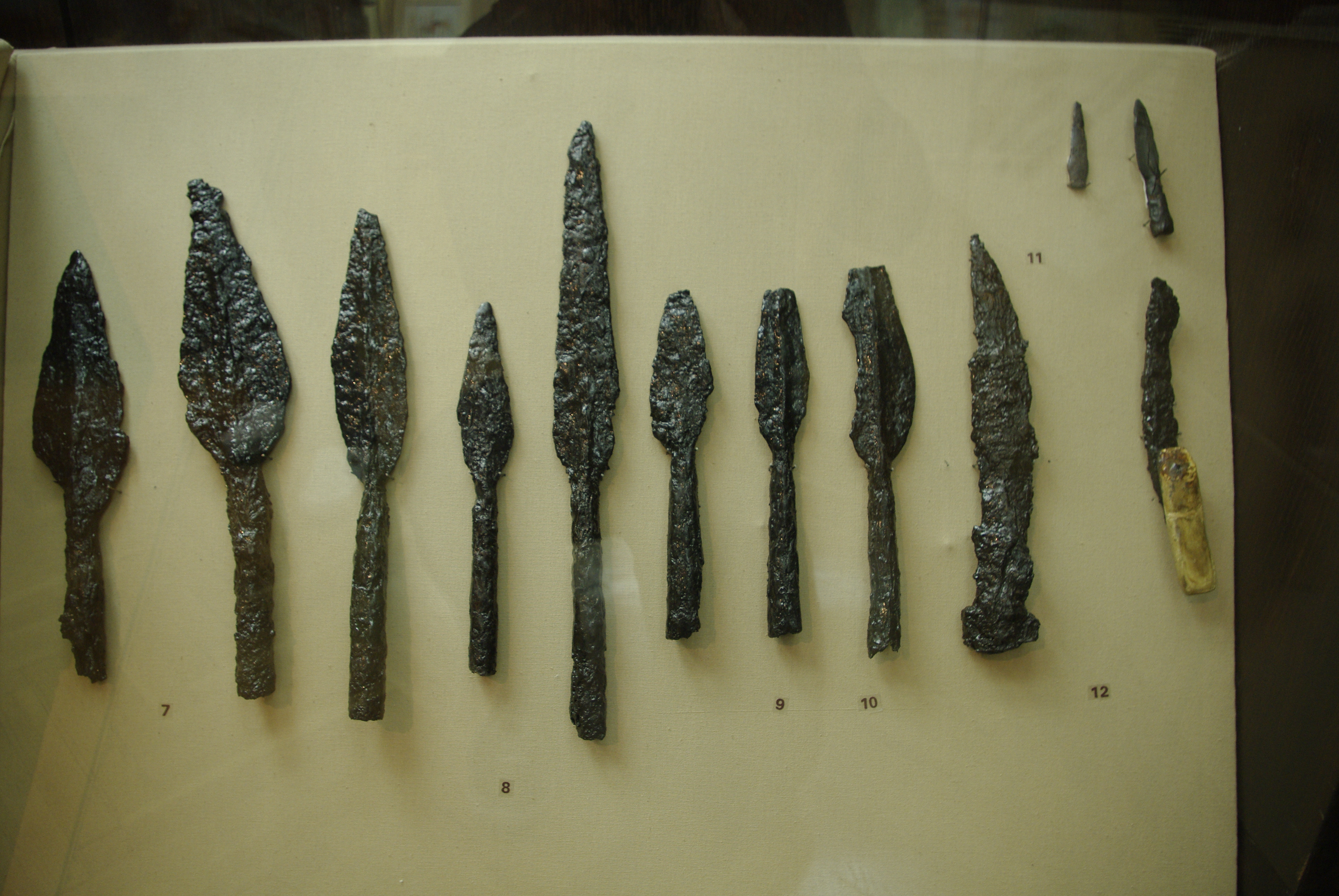

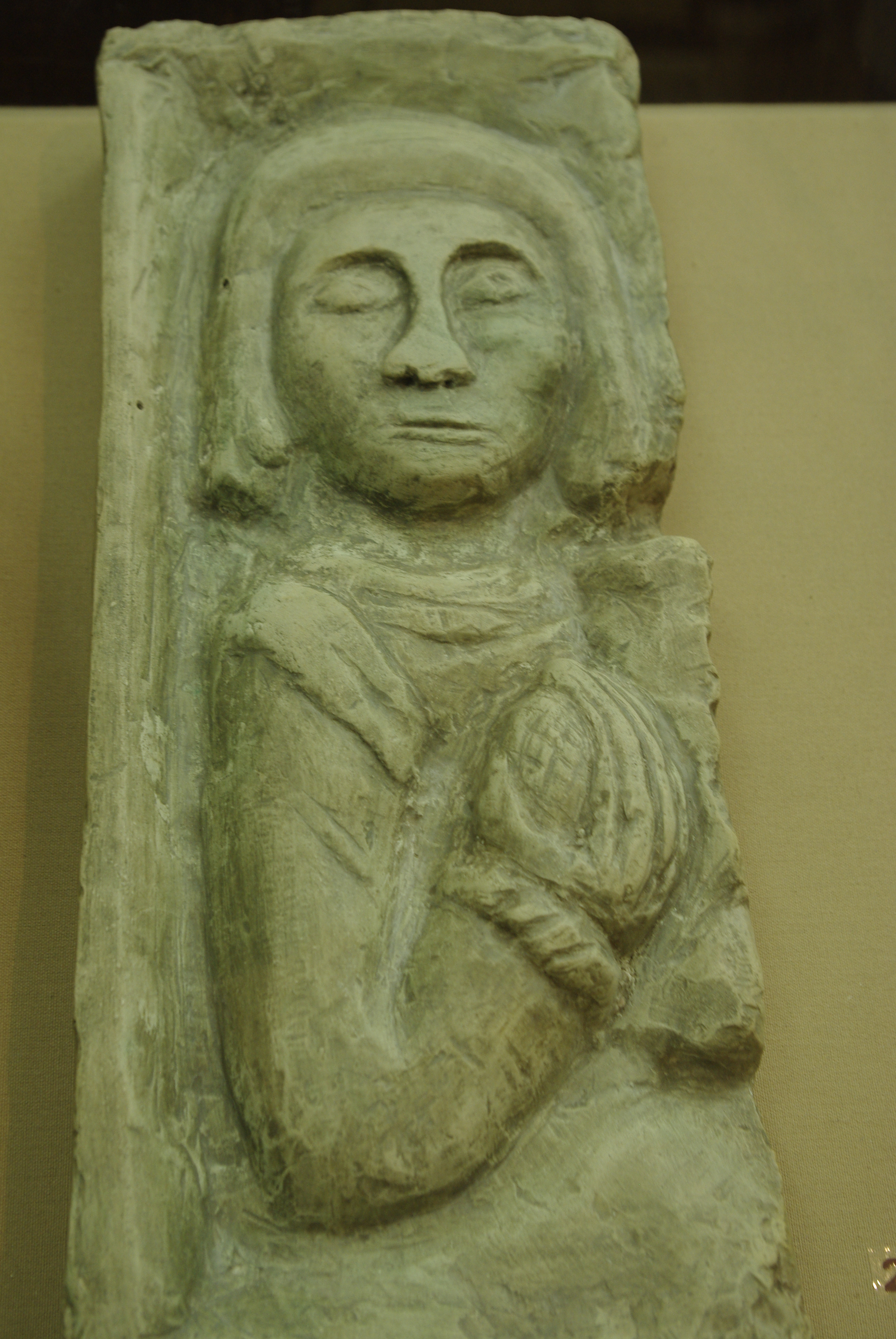

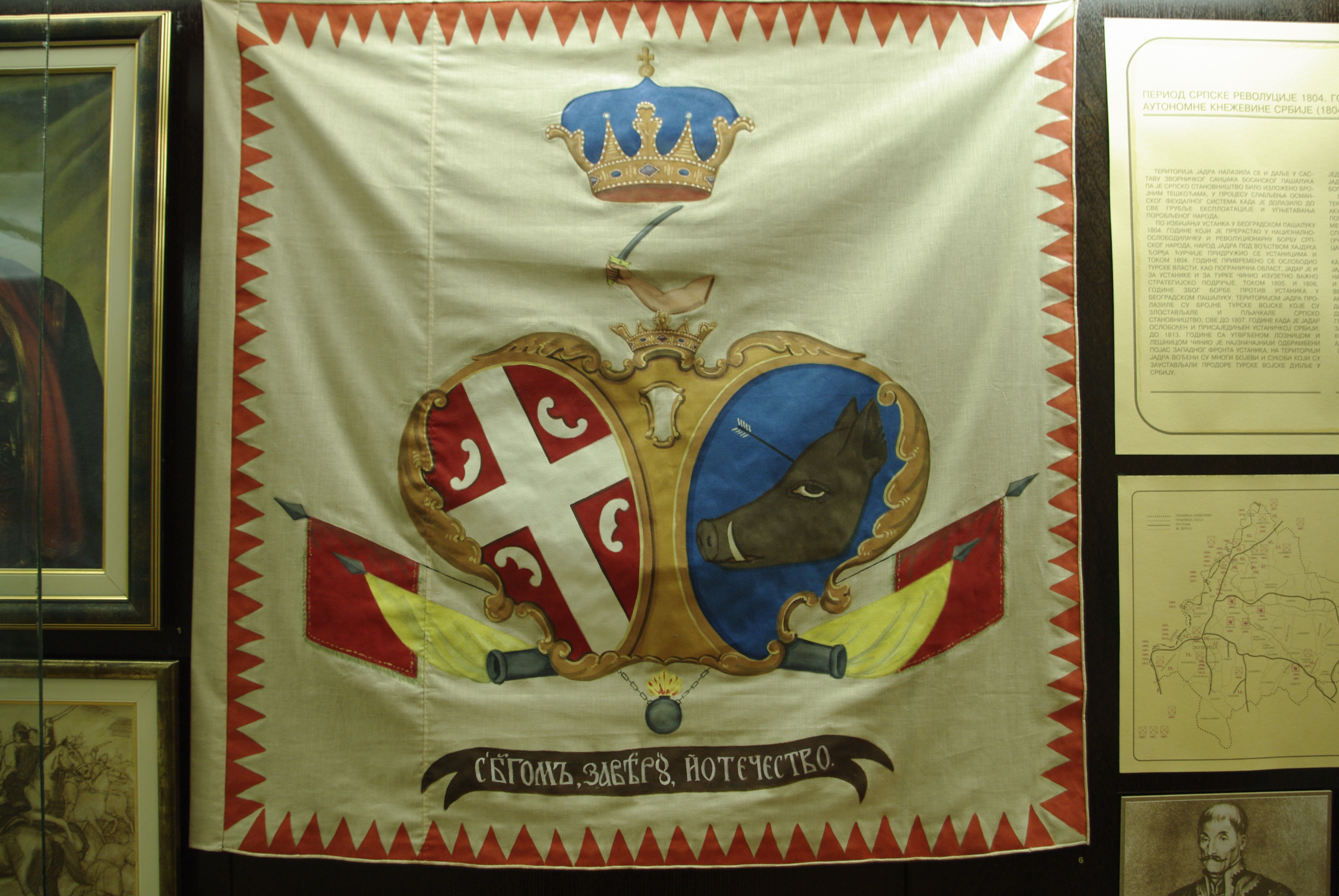
Replica of a flag of the First Serbian Uprising

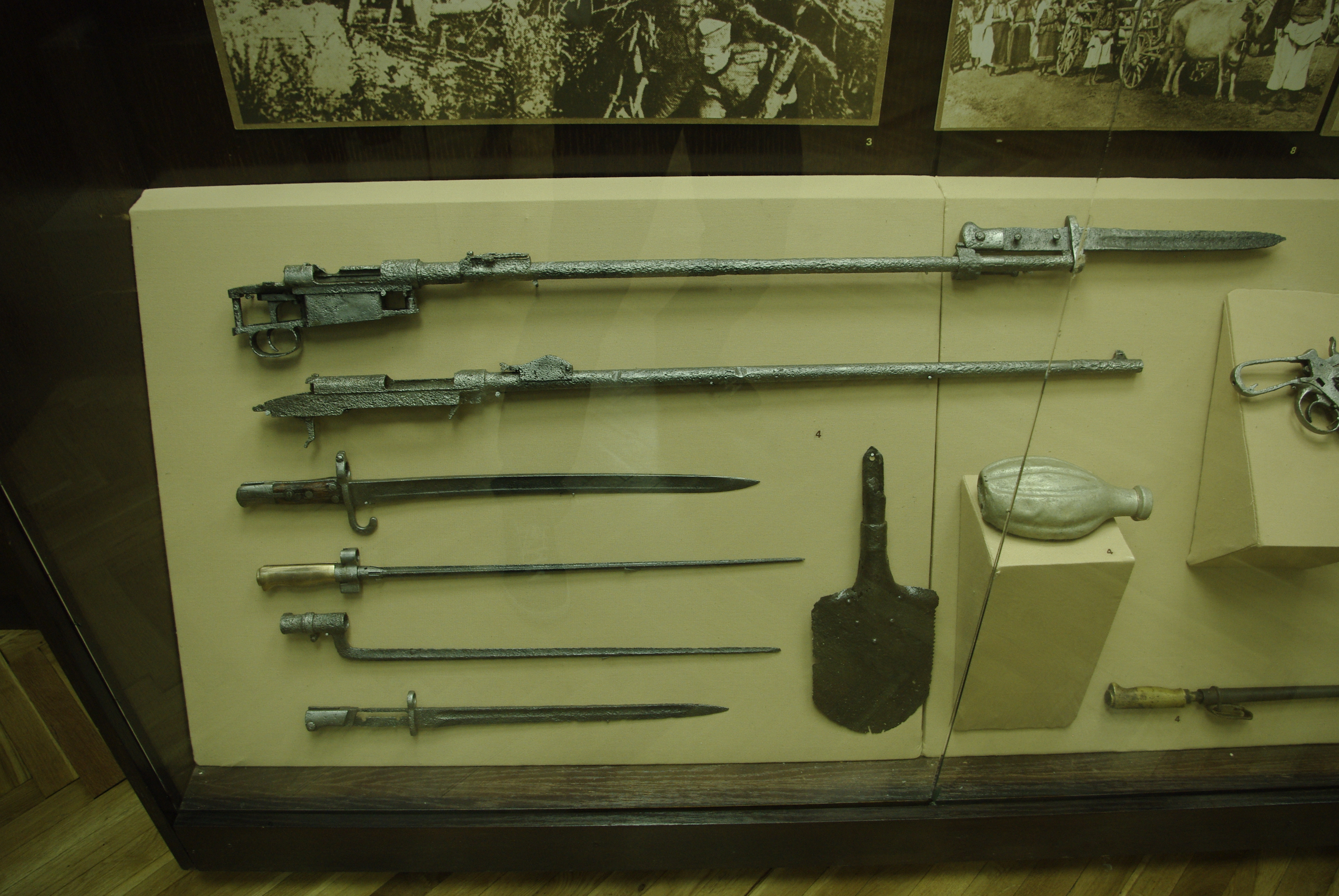
Weapons from WWi

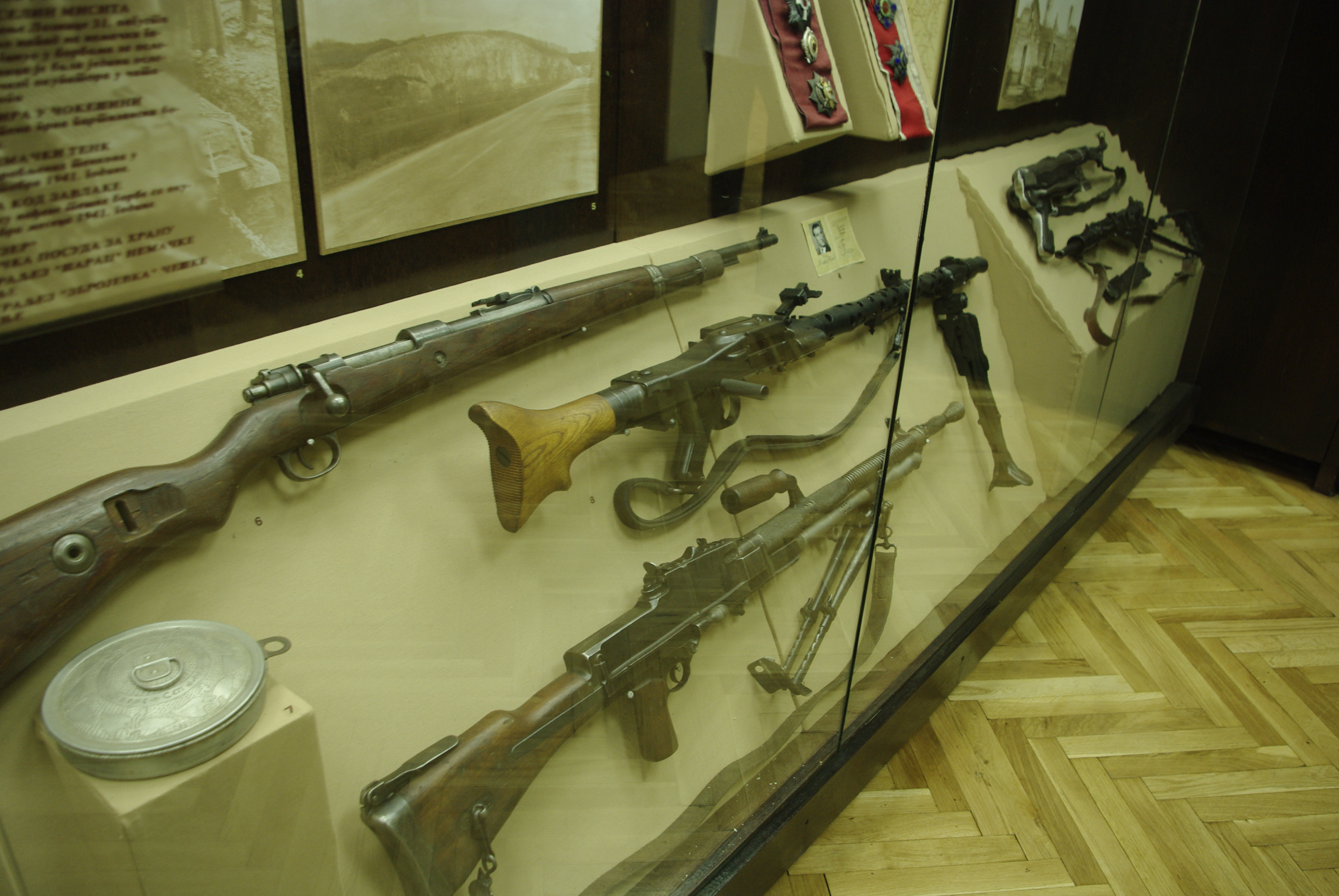
Weapons from WWII

== See also ==
- Loznica
- Vidin Grad
- Koviljkin grad
- Trojanov Grad
- Gensis (vicus)
- List of museums in Serbia
