= Genisys =

Genisys may refer to:

- Genisys Credit Union, a credit union based in Auburn Hills, Michigan
- Terminator Genisys, the fifth installment in the Terminator series of films
- Genisys, a former research project set up by the Information Awareness Office

== See also ==
- Genesys (disambiguation)
- Genesis (disambiguation)
