= Genesis =

Genesis may refer to:

== Religion ==
- Book of Genesis, the first book of the biblical scriptures of both Judaism and Christianity, describing the creation of the Earth and of humankind
- Genesis creation narrative, the first several chapters of the Book of Genesis, which describes the origin of the Earth
- Genesis Rabbah, a midrash probably written between 300 and 500 CE with some later additions, comprising a collection of interpretations of the Book of Genesis
- The Genesis According to Spiritism, the last book of Allan Kardec's Pentateuch, that attempts to connect religion with science

== Arts and media ==
=== Film ===
- Genesis (1986 film), an Indian film directed by Mrinal Sen Sen
- Genesis (1994 film), an Italian television film
- Genesis (1999 film), a Malian film
- Genesis (2004 film), a documentary
- Genesis (2018 Canadian film)
- Genesis (2018 Hungarian film)
- Rec 3: Genesis, a 2012 Spanish horror film directed by Paco Plaza
- Project Genesis and the Genesis Planet, a fictional technology and the planet created by it in Star Trek II: The Wrath of Khan and Star Trek III: The Search for Spock

=== Gaming ===
- Genesis (tournament), a Super Smash Bros. tournament in the San Francisco Bay Area
- Sega Genesis, a video game console also known as the Mega Drive
- Genesis LPMud, the first MUD of the LPMud family
- Genesis Rhapsodos, main antagonist of the video game Crisis Core: Final Fantasy VII
- X-COM: Genesis, a computer game
- Xenoblade Genesis, a 2027 video game

=== Literature ===
==== Comics ====
- Genesis (DC Comics), a 1997 crossover
- Genesis (Lebrun), 1960 mural by Italian-American painter and sculptor Rico Lebrun
- Genesis (Marvel Comics), a supervillain
- Genesis, a fictional character in the comic book series Preacher
- The Book of Genesis (comics), comic-book adaptation illustrated by Robert Crumb

==== Other literature ====
- "Genesis", a 1951 story by H. Beam Piper
- Genesis: The Origins of Man and the Universe, a 1982 science text by John Gribbin
- Genesis, a 1988 epic poem by Frederick Turner
- "Genesis", a 2000 story by Poul Anderson
- Genesis (Beckett novel), a 2006 work by Bernard Beckett
- "Genesis", a 2007 story by Paul Chafe
- Genesis (journal), a scientific journal of biology
- Genesis (magazine), a pornographic magazine
- Genesis Publications, a British publishing company
- Genesis, a graphic novel by Nathan Edmondson
- The Genesis According to Spiritism, the last book of Allan Kardec's Pentateuch, that attempts to connect religion with science

=== Music ===
==== Artists ====
- Genesis (band), English rock band
- Génesis (band), Colombian folk rock band
- Genesis (1971–1974), original name for American rock/metal band Vixen
- Genesis P-Orridge (1950–2020), English musician and frontperson of Throbbing Gristle
- Genesis Drum and Bugle Corps, a drum and bugle corp from Austin, Texas

==== Albums ====
- Genesis (Busta Rhymes album)
- Genesis (Charles Sullivan album)
- Genesis, by Coprofago
- Genesis (Diaura album)
- Genesis (Domo Genesis album)
- Genesis (Elvin Jones album)
- Genesis (Genesis album)
- Genesis (The Gods album)
- Genesis, by JJ Lin
- Genesis (Job for a Cowboy album)
- Genesis (Joy Williams album)
- Genesis, by Larry Heard
- Génesis (Mary Ann Acevedo album)
- Genesis (Notaker EP)
- Génesis (Peso Pluma album)
- Genesis (Rotting Christ album)
- Genesis (S.H.E album)
- Genesis (Talisman album)
- Genesis, by The-Dream
- Genesis (Woe, Is Me album)
- The Genesis, by Yngwie Malmsteen

==== Songs ====
- "Genesis" (Grimes song)
- "Génesis" (Lucecita Benítez song)
- "Genesis" (Matthew Shell and Arun Shenoy song)
- "Genesis" (Michalis Hatzigiannis song)
- "Genesis" (Raye song)
- "Genesis" (VNV Nation song)
- "Genesis", by Ambrose Slade from Beginnings
- "Genesis", by Benjamin Clementine from And I Have Been
- "Genesis", by Cult of Luna from The Beyond
- "Genesis", by Deftones from Ohms
- "Genesis", by Devin Townsend from Empath
- "Genesis", by Dua Lipa from Dua Lipa
- "Genesis", by Eir Aoi, from Aldnoah.Zero
- "Genesis", by Ghost, from Opus Eponymous
- "Genesis", by Glass Casket, from Desperate Man's Diary
- "Genesis", by Jorma Kaukonen from Quah
- "Genesis", by Justice, from Cross
- "Genesis", by Mumzy Stranger and Yasmin from Journey Begins
- "Genesis", by Morgan Wallen from I'm the Problem
- "Genesis", by Northlane, from Singularity
- "Genesis", by Rings of Saturn, from Rings of Saturn
- "Genesis", by Running Wild, from Black Hand Inn
- "Genesis", by Suicideboys from Sing Me a Lullaby, My Sweet Temptation, 2022
- "Genesis", by The Ventures
- "Génesis", by Mägo de Oz, from Jesús de Chamberí
- "Génesis", by Vox Dei, from La Biblia

=== Television ===
- "Genesis" (Arrow), episode of Arrow
- Genesis (TV series), Filipino television series
- "Genesis" (Heroes), pilot episode of Heroes
- "Genesis" (Quantum Leap)
- "Genesis" (Sliders), episode of Sliders
- "Genesis" (Survivors), episode of Survivors
- "Genesis" (Star Trek: The Next Generation), episode of Star Trek: The Next Generation
- Genesis II (film), science fiction TV movie created and produced by Gene Roddenberry
- Genesis Awards, television awards
- Genesis Entertainment, a News Corporation subsidiary
- TNA Genesis, a professional wrestling pay-per-view and television program
  - TNA Genesis (2005)
  - TNA Genesis (2006)
  - TNA Genesis (2007)
  - TNA Genesis (2009)
  - TNA Genesis (2010)
  - TNA Genesis (2011)
  - TNA Genesis (2012)
  - TNA Genesis (2013)
  - TNA Genesis (2014)
  - Impact Wrestling Genesis (2017)
  - Impact Wrestling Genesis (2018)
  - Impact Wrestling Genesis (2021)
  - TNA Genesis (2025)
- Zoids: Genesis, fifth anime installment of the Zoids franchise
- Genesis (Air Gear), fictional Air Trek team in Air Gear
- Gênesis, Brazilian telenovela broadcast by RecordTV
- Genesis (miniseries), a 2023 animated web miniseries

=== Other media ===
- Mihrab (painting), by Osman Hamdi Bey also known as Genesis

== Companies ==
- Genesis (cryptocurrency company), an American cryptocurrency brokerage
- Genesis Energy Limited, a New Zealand electricity generator and retailer
- Genesis HealthCare, a nursing home facility operator
- Genesis Microchip, a semiconductor company acquired by STMicroelectronics in 2007
- Genesis Publications, a British publishing company
- Genesis Transport, a bus company in the Philippines

== People ==
=== Given name ===
- Genesis Cabrera (born 1996), Dominican professional baseball player
- Génesis Dávila (born 1990), Puerto Rican model and beauty pageant titleholder
- Génesis Franchesco (born 1990), Venezuelan volleyball player
- Genesis Lynea (born 1989), Bermudian-British actress, singer, dancer, and model
- Genesis Potini (1963–2011), New Zealand speed chess player
- Genesis Rodriguez (born 1987), American actress
- Génesis Rodríguez (weightlifter) (born 1994), Venezuelan weightlifter
- Génesis Romero (born 1995), Venezuelan athlete
- Genesis Servania (born 1991), Filipino professional boxer
- Genesis Smith (born 2004), American football player

=== Surname ===
- Mercy Genesis (born 1997), Nigerian wrestler

== Science and technology ==
- Genesis (blockchain), the time and date of the first block of a blockchain data structure
- GENESIS (software), GEneral NEural SImulation System
- Genesis Framework, a theme for the WordPress CMS
- Genesis LPMud, the first MUD of the LPMud family
- Norton 360, codenamed Project Genesis or simply Genesis
- Genesis Mission, a US federal program aimed at accelerating scientific research through AI, led by the DOE and launched by the White House

== Transportation ==
=== Air- and spacecraft ===
- Aviomania Genesis Duo G2SA, a Cypriot autogyro design
- Aviomania Genesis Solo G1SA, a Cypriot autogyro design
- SlipStream Genesis, kit aircraft
- Genesis (spacecraft), a NASA probe that collected solar samples
- Genesis I, a private spacecraft produced by Bigelow Aerospace
  - Genesis II (space habitat), a follow-up to Genesis I

=== Automotive ===
- Bertone Genesis, a concept truck
- Genesis GMR-001, sports prototype developed by Genesis and Oreca
  - Genesis G8MR engine, V8 racing engine, made by Hyundai Motorsport for use in their Genesis GMR-001 LMDh race car
- Genesis Motor, luxury vehicle division of Hyundai Motor Company Group
  - Hyundai Genesis, original vehicle of which the Genesis marque is named
- Genesis Transport, a bus company in the Philippines
- Yamaha FZR600 Genesis, a motorcycle

=== Other uses in transportation ===
- GE Genesis, a locomotive
- Genesis (bikes), a British bicycle brand
- Oasis class cruise ship, a class of Royal Caribbean cruise ships, formerly known as Project Genesis

== Other uses ==
- Genesis (camera), a high-definition camera by Panavision
- Genesis Rock, a sample of lunar crust retrieved by Apollo 15 astronauts

== See also ==
- Terminator Genisys, a 2015 science fiction action film and fifth entry in the Terminator series
- Abiogenesis, the origin of life
- Biogenesis, the production of new living organisms
- Genesis Solar Energy Project, a solar power plant in California, US
- Mass Effect Genesis, an interactive comic attached to the game Mass Effect 2
- Project Genesis (disambiguation)
- Genesys (disambiguation)
- Genisys (disambiguation)
- Gensis (disambiguation)
- Genesis (given name)
- Gemesis, a diamond company
