= Gensis (vicus) =

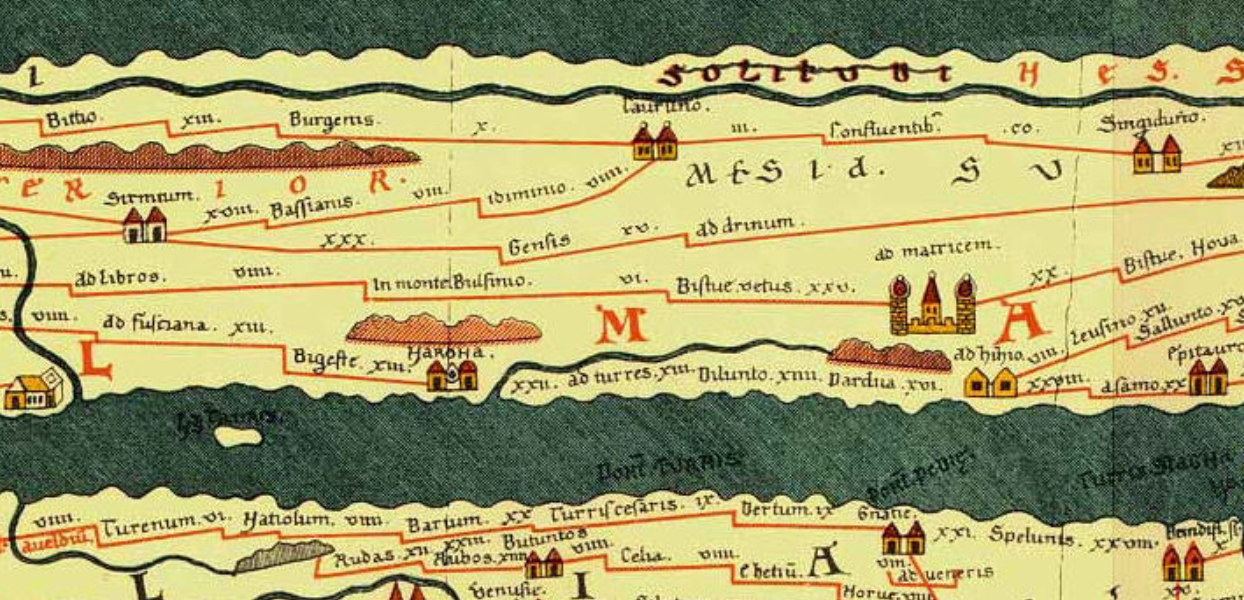
Gensis on Tabula Peutingeriana

Gensis was the Roman settlement vicus in Moesia Superior, now central Serbia, on Cer mountain near Lešnica.

== Tabula Peutingeriana ==
It is recorded in the Tabula Peutingeriana as situated XXX m.p. south of Sirmium, on via Argentaria, a road leading in the direction of Drina; on the mountain Cer area, and XV m.p. from Ad Drinum (allegedly today's Loznica).

== Position ==
However, the position of Gensis is not established because on the same mountain Cer are located ruins of the three different settlements that can be vicus Gensis, Vidin Grad, Kosanin grad and Trojanov Grad.

As none of these three sites has been explored, it is not possible to determine the exact position of vicus Gensis.

== See also ==
- Museum in Loznica
- Vidin Grad
- Koviljkin grad
- Trojanov Grad
