= Gensi (disambiguation) =

Gensi may refer to:

- Gensi, Lower Siang, Arunachal Pradesh, India; a town
- Gensi Township (根思乡), Taixing, Taizhou, Jiangsu, China; a township; see List of township-level divisions of Jiangsu
- Yang Gensi (1922–1950; 杨根思) Chinese war hero of the Korean War
- Twin Gensi (双幻士 Sōgenshi), fictional characters from Juken Sentai Gekiranger, see List of Juken Sentai Gekiranger characters

== See also ==
- Gensis (disambiguation)
