= Project Genesis =

Project Genesis may refer to:

- Project Genesis (Star Trek), a fictional technology from the Star Trek universe
- A project by Royal Caribbean International to develop their latest cruise ships—the Oasis-class cruise ship
- An alternate name for the TV series Deepwater Black
- Toyota Project Genesis, a 1999 plan to attract more youthful buyers
- Genesis (Final Fantasy character), a character in the Compilation of Final Fantasy VII
- Genesis Device, an LGPL licensed game engine
- Norton 360, codenamed Project Genesis or simply Genesis
- Project Genesis, a collaborative project between Freightliner, UK and General Electric for a main line freight locomotive, subsequently named PowerHaul
- Project Genesis, a demo (computer-based audio-visual work of art) by Hungarian demogroup Conspiracy
- Project Genesis (ESA), a program of the ESA to increase earth observation satellites accuracy to within 1 mm and a long-term stability of 0.1 mm/year.
- Genesis Project, conceptual low-cost interstellar mission aiming to establish a biosphere on other planets

== See also ==
- Genesis (disambiguation)
