= Trojanov Grad =

Coordinates: 44°35′18″N 19°31′25″E

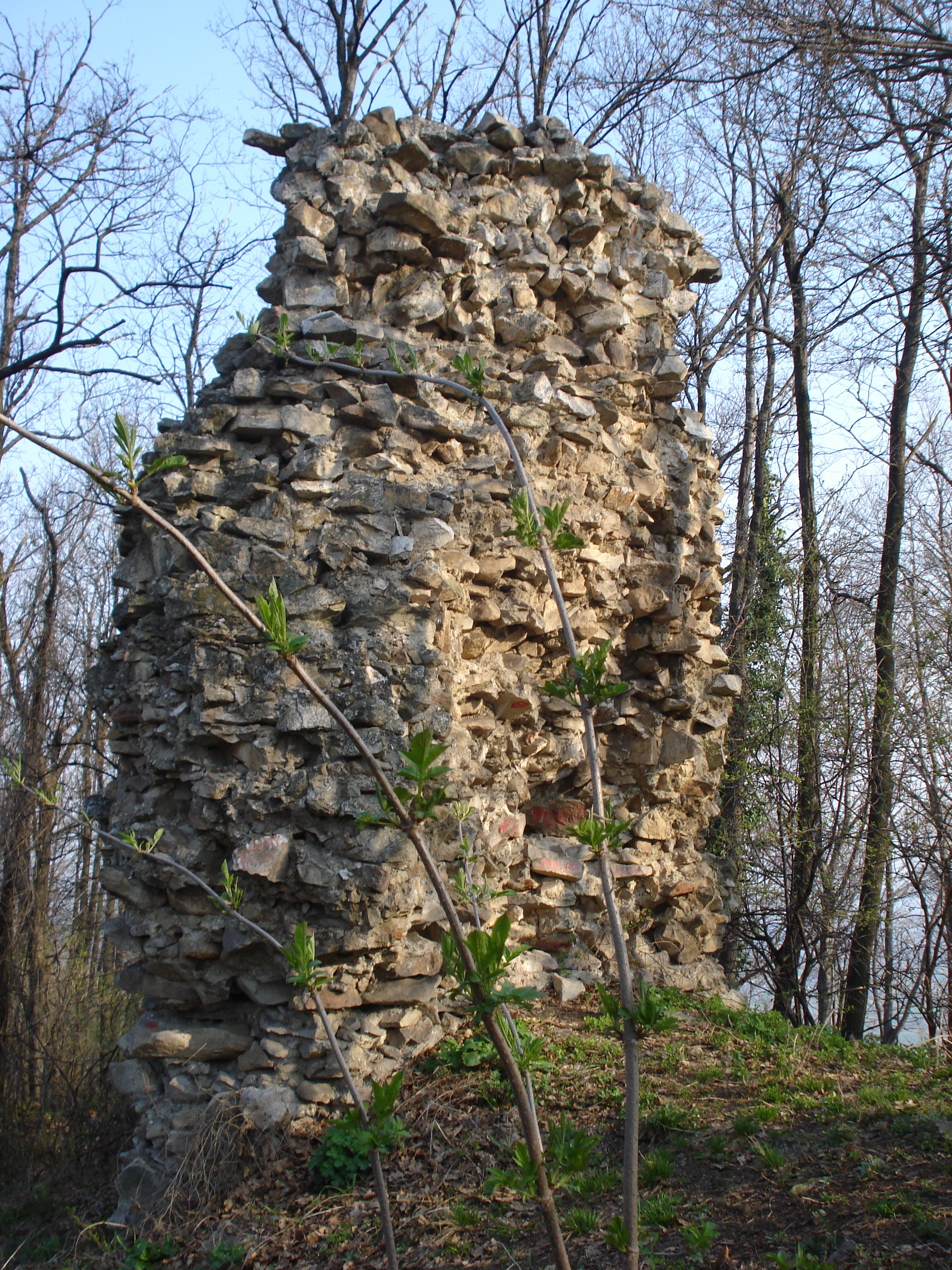
Trojanov Grad

Trojanov Grad or Town of Trajan was a fortress on mountain Cer, central Serbia, which is being attributed to the mythical Slavic Emperor Trajan.

Today it is possible to see only remains of one defense wall.

== See also ==
- Koviljkin grad
- Vidin Grad
- Gensis (vicus)
- Museum in Loznica
