= Genesys (video game) =

2000 video game

- Developers: Cybele Productions, Wanadoo Edition
- Platform: Windows PC / Mac
- Release: 2000
- Genres: Education, Adventure

Genesys is an educational video game, released in 2000 for Windows-based PCs and Apple Macintoshes. It was developed by Cybele Productions and Wanadoo Edition.

The player is guided by Jeanne Moreau through Claude Richardet's game. The game allows the player to discover the key stages of the evolution of various human societies around the world.
