= Koviljkin grad =

Archaeological site in Serbia

Coordinates: 44°30′44″N 19°09′59″E

Koviljkin grad or Koviljka is a name for archaeological ruins close to Banja Koviljača in the Loznica district of western Serbia. The ruins are of a Roman town, which may have been named Gensis; the name has never been confirmed. It is located on the top of a hill, and the remains of the walls spread about 150 metres around it.

At the time of the Roman Empire, the river Drina flowed underneath this settlement, and it is believed that there was a Roman river harbour.

The site has not been completely explored by archaeologists.

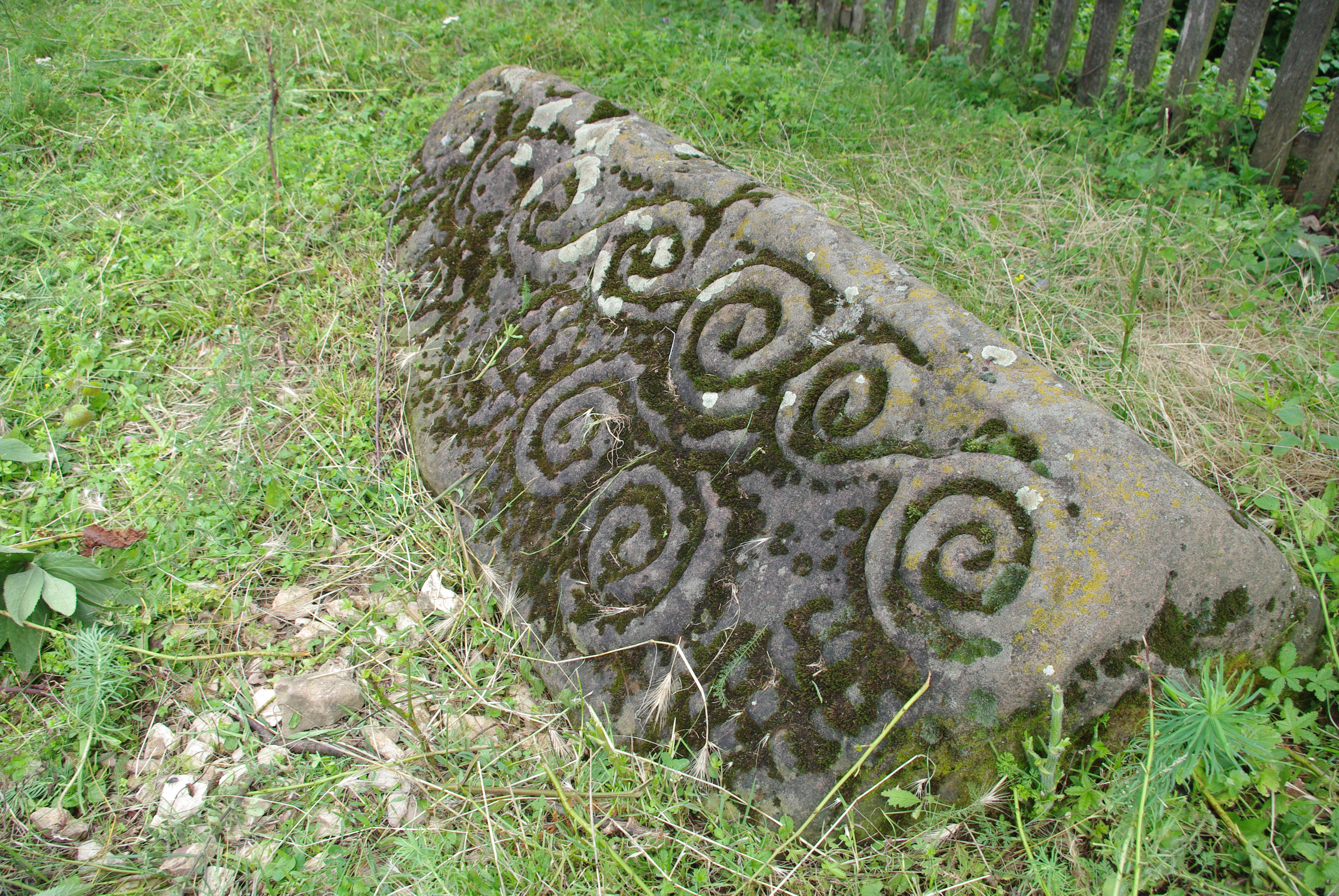
Roman stone near Town of Koviljka

== Gallery ==
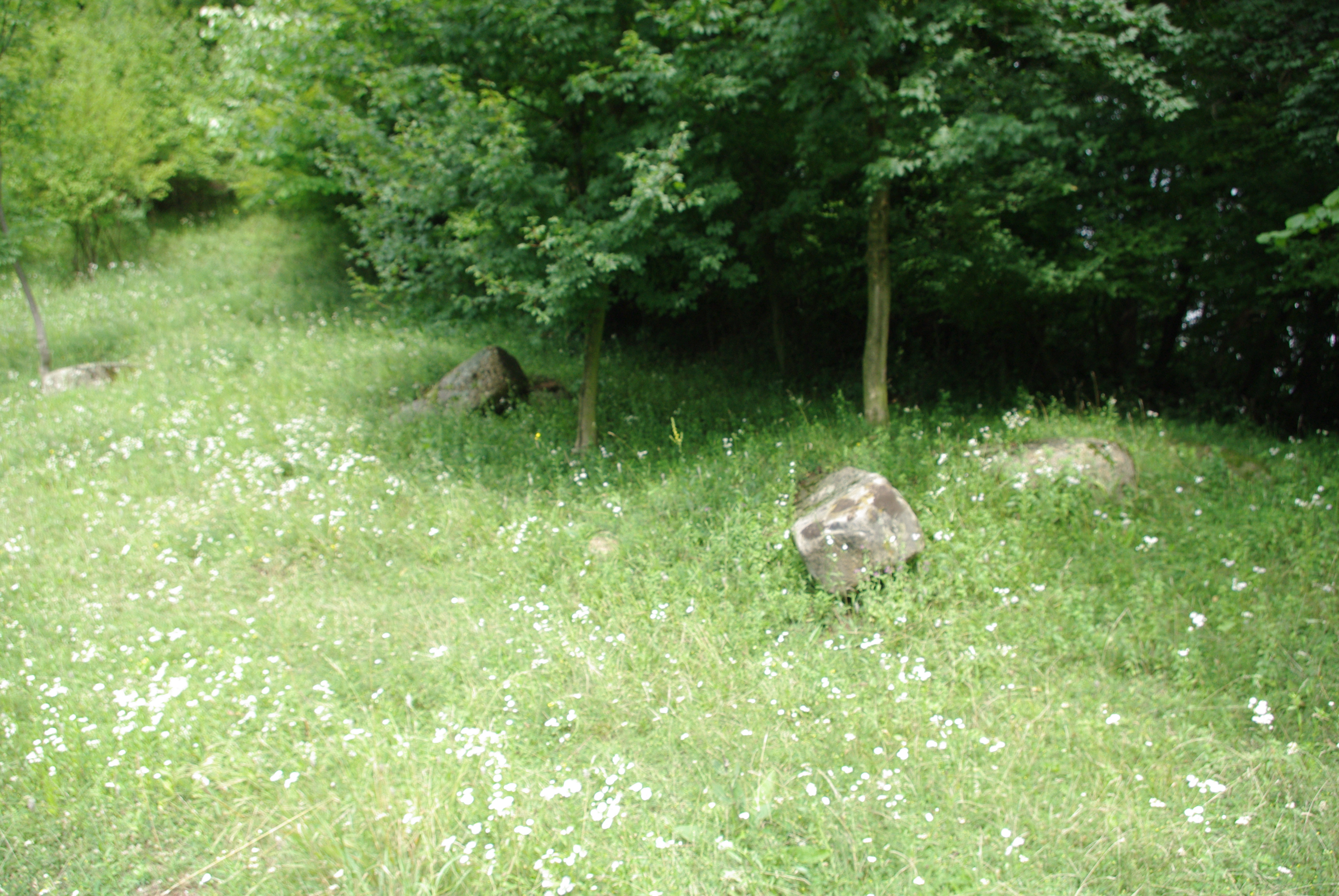
Roman stones

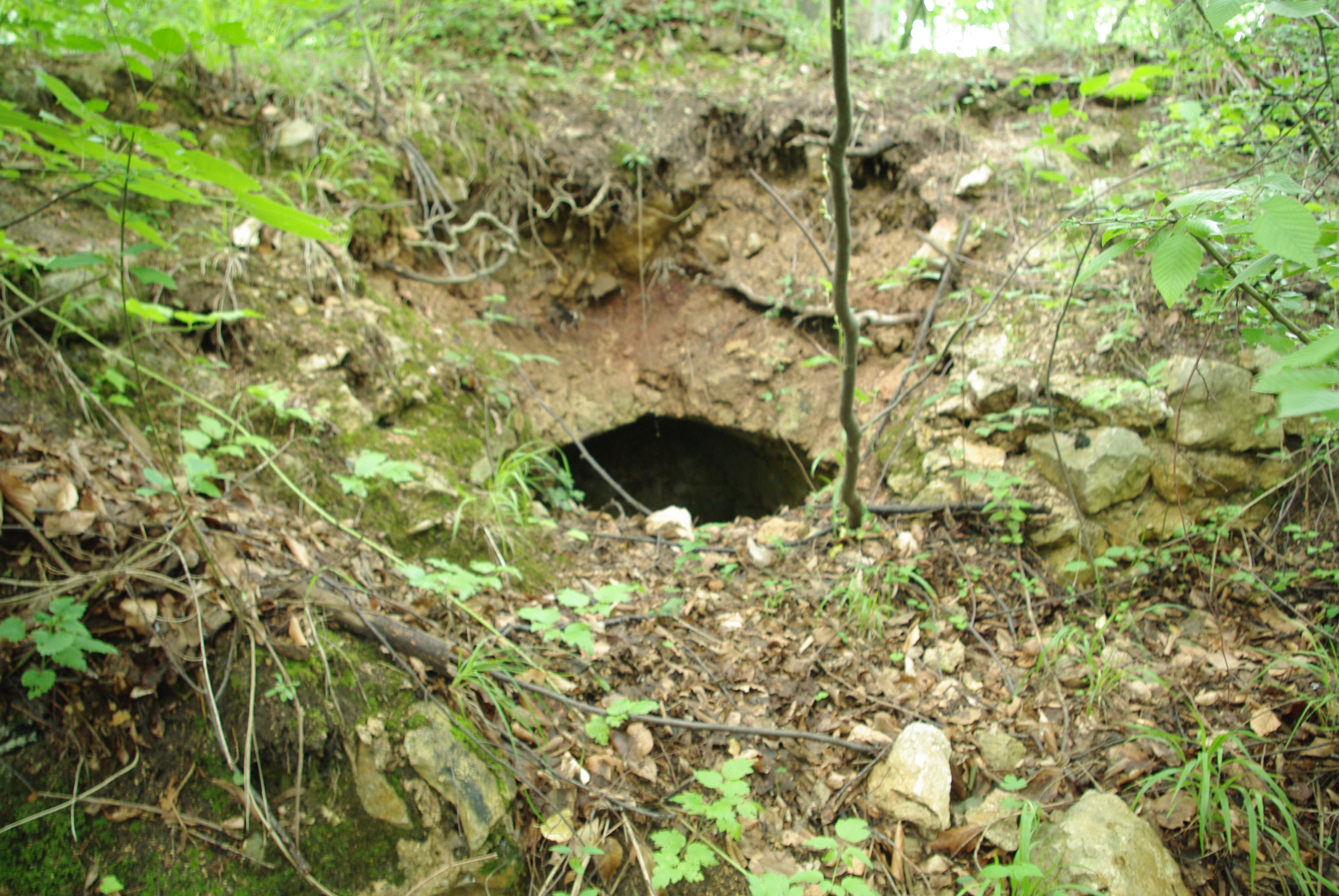
One of the rooms in the Town of Koviljka

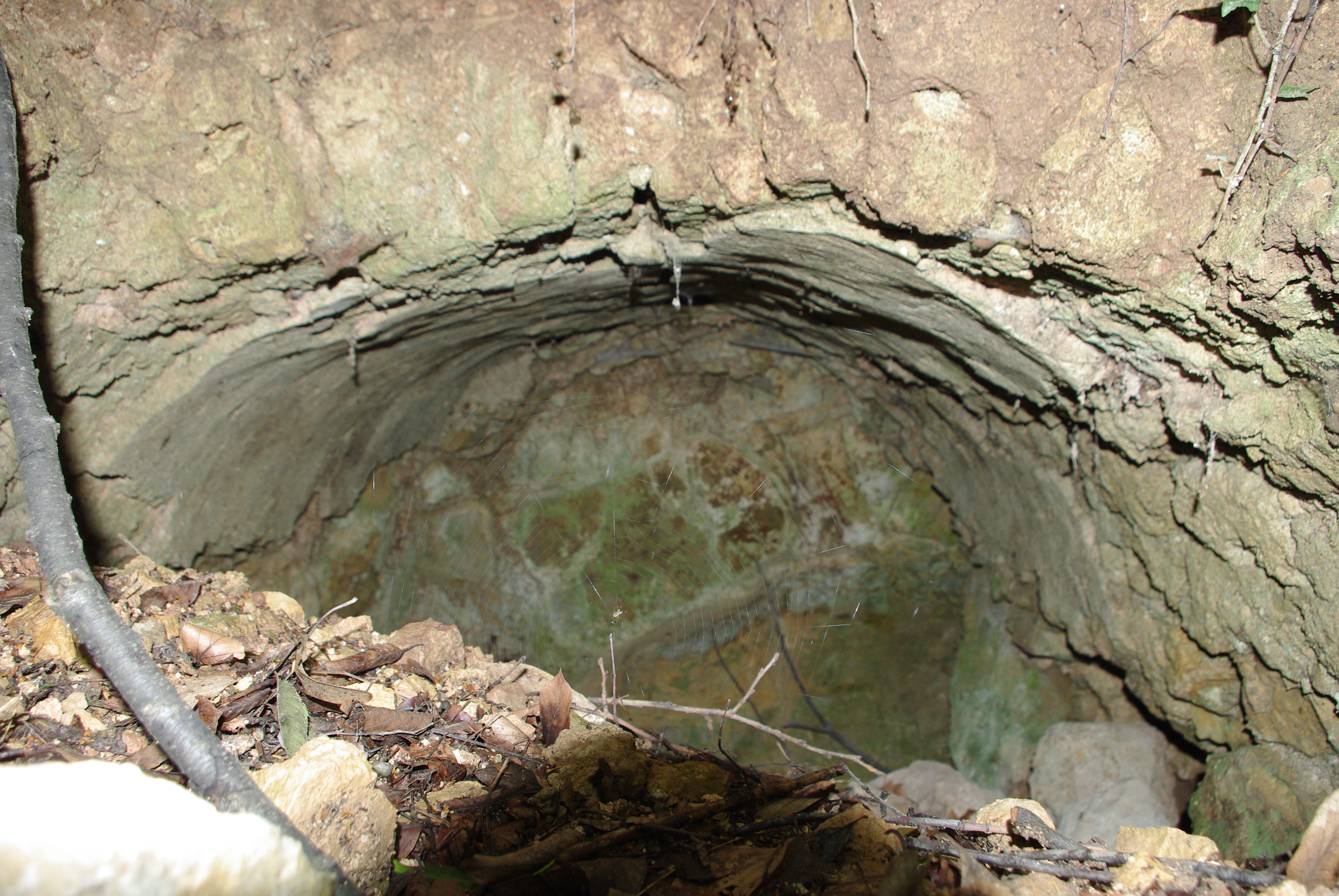
One of the rooms, close up

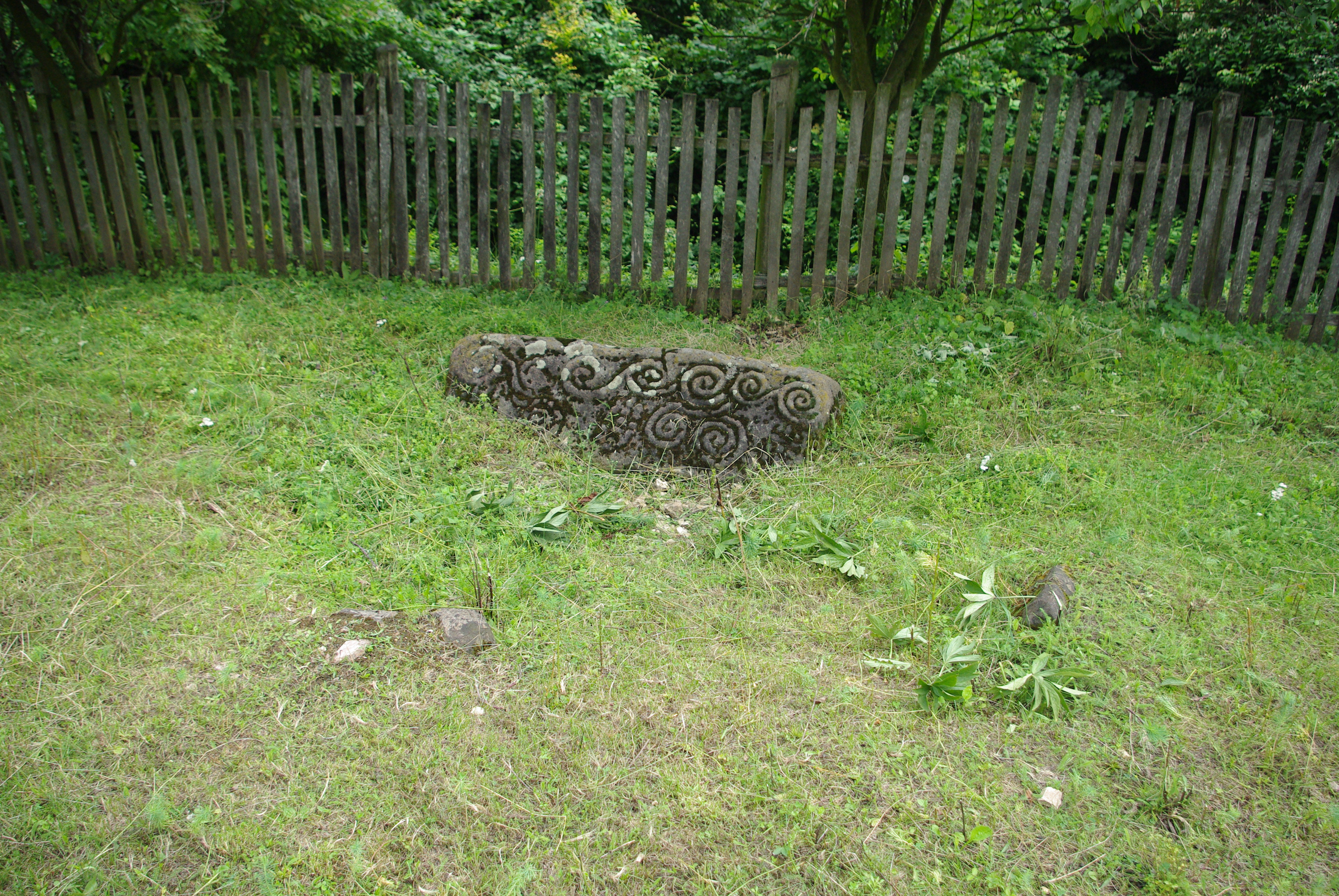
Carved stone near the town

== See also ==
- Vidin Grad
- Trojanov Grad
- Gensis (vicus)
- Museum in Loznica
