= Genisys Credit Union =

Credit union in Michigan and Minnesota, US

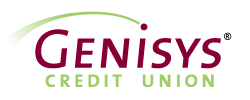
- Company type: Credit union
- Industry: Financial services
- Founded: 1936
- Headquarters: Auburn Hills, Michigan, United States
- Number of locations: 32 (2019)
- Key people: Jackie Buchanan (CEO)
- AUM: $2.567 billion (2019)
- Website: www.genisyscu.org

Genisys Credit Union is a credit union based in Auburn Hills, Michigan.

Genisys Credit Union is the 5th largest credit union in Michigan with over 210,000 members and assets of 2.6 billion as of October 31, 2018. They operate 28 branch locations in Michigan and 3 in Minnesota. In addition, Genisys belongs to the CO-OP Network which provides its members access to over 30,000 surcharge-free ATMs and 5,000 Shared Branch locations. The organization is a federally insured state-chartered credit union that is regulated by the National Credit Union Administration (NCUA). Genisys Credit Union was officially chartered in 1936.

== Membership ==
Membership in Genisys Credit Union is open to people who live, work, worship, attend school or own a business in the following areas: All 68 counties in the lower peninsula of Michigan, Dakota, Ramsey, Anoka, Hennepin, Scott and Washington Counties in Minnesota, and Montgomery County in Pennsylvania. Membership is also open to employees of affiliated select employee groups, and members of an affiliated association. Genisys Credit Union serves almost 450 different employee or associational groups. Membership is also open to immediate family members of a Genisys Credit Union member

== Awards ==
Genisys has received numerous awards including:

• Earned the "Best of Bauer" Award for being 5-star rated based on safety and soundness for more than 100 consecutive quarters.

• Ranked as one of the top 100 safest credit unions in the country by BankRate.com

• Listed in the top 200 healthiest credit unions in the country by DepositAccounts.com

• Detroit Free Press Top 100 Workplaces winner 8 consecutive years in a row.
