= Lešnica, Serbia =

Lešnica Лешница (Serbian)
- Village (Selo)
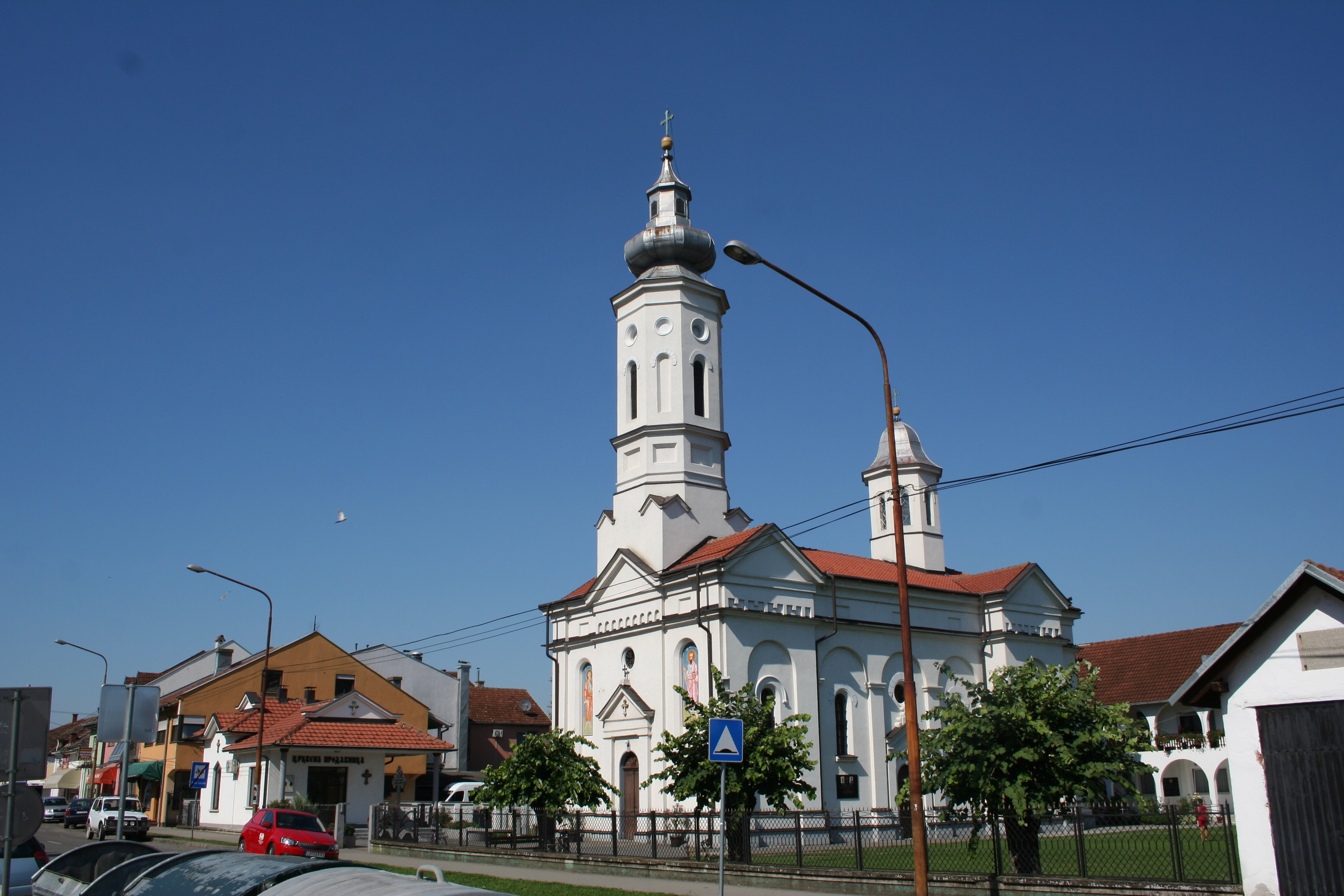
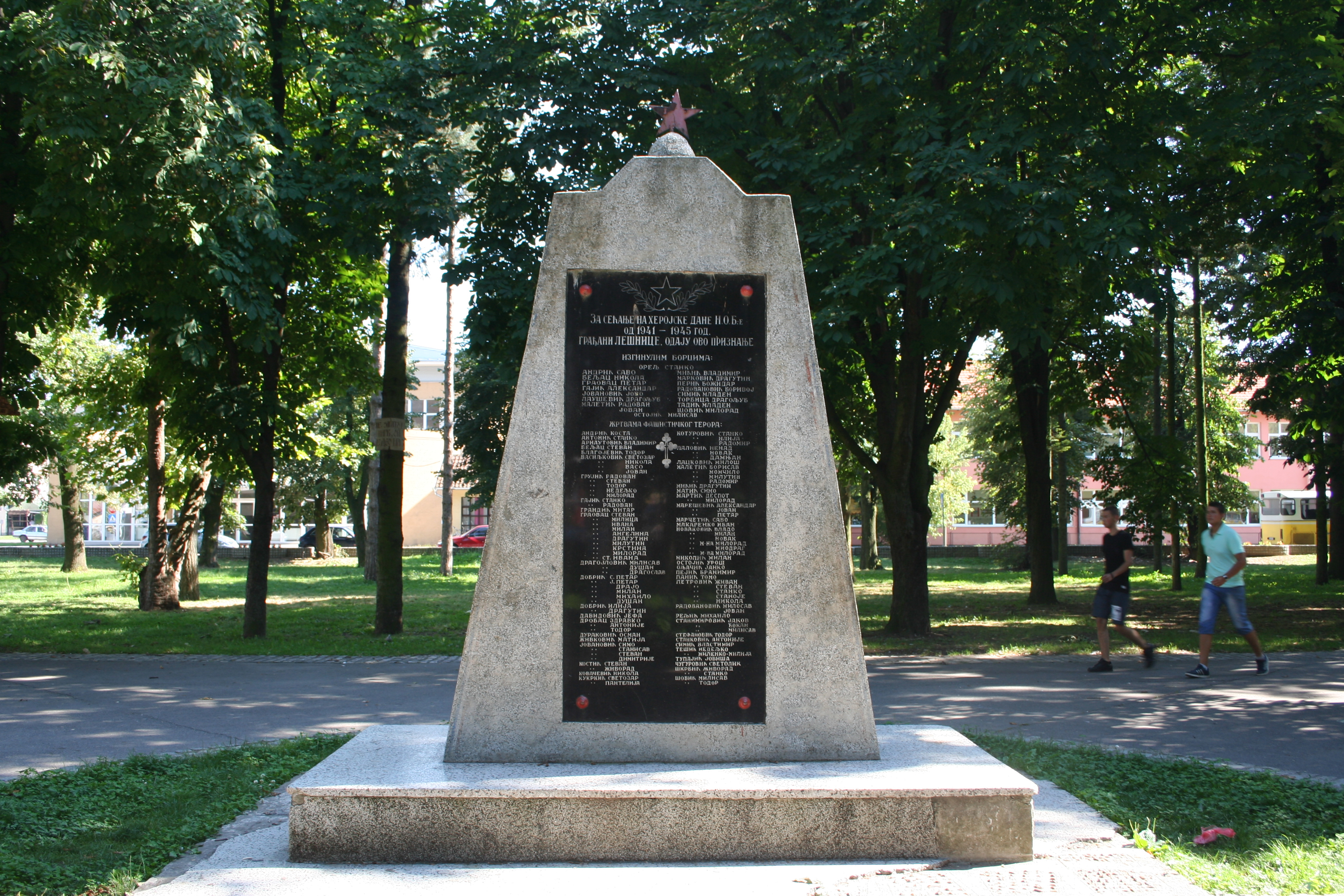
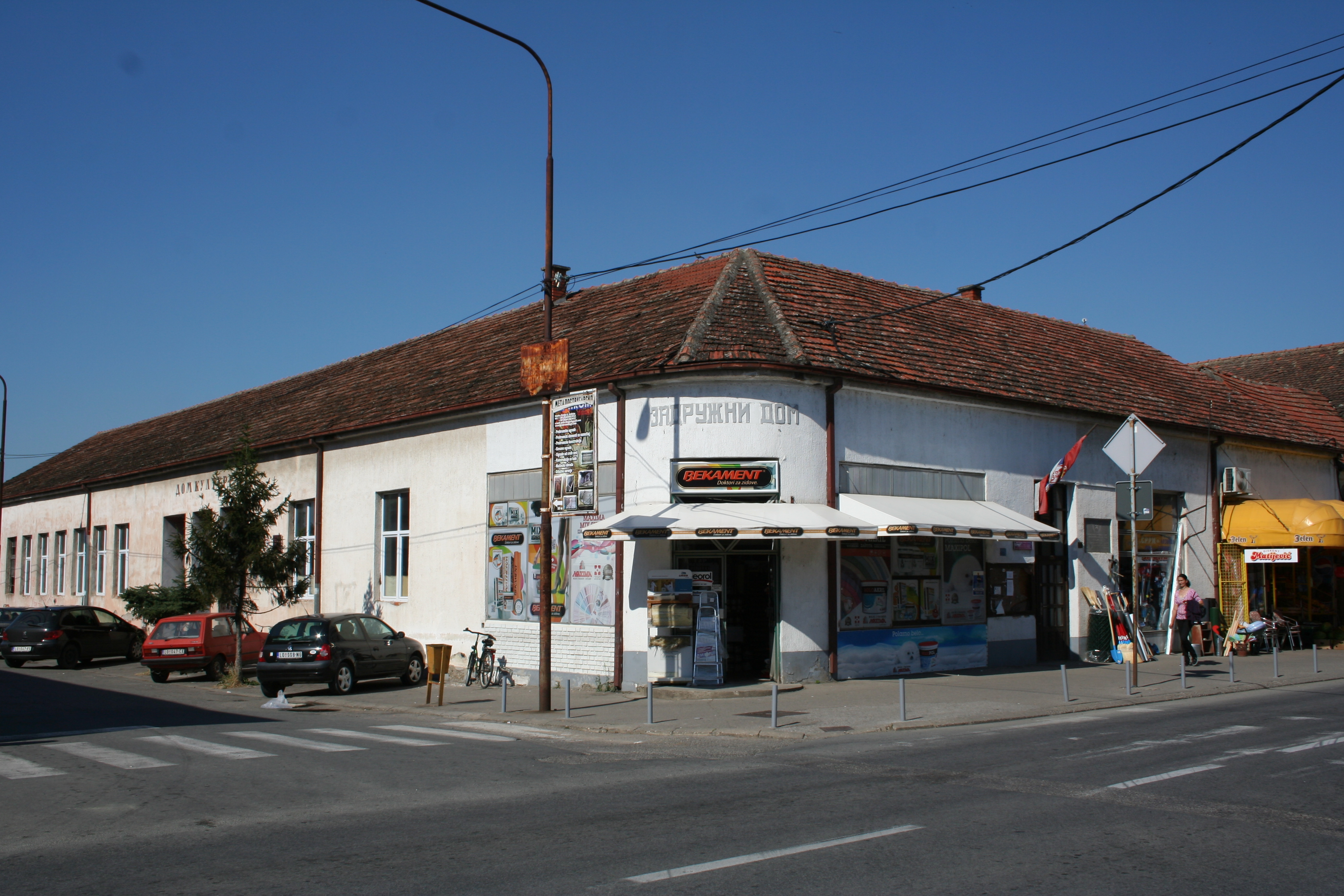
- Lešnica

- Location within Serbia
- Coordinates: 44°39′09″N 19°18′36″E
- Country: Serbia

Population (2022)
  - Total: 3,818
- Time zone: UTC+1 (CET)
  - Summer (DST): UTC+2 (CEST)

Lešnica (Serbian Cyrillic: Лешница, pronounced [ˈlɛʃnitsa], meaning "a place of hazels") is a village in western Serbia. It is located in the municipality of Loznica, in the Mačva District. Lešnica's population as of the 2022 Serbian census is 3,818.

== History ==
The village was first mentioned in the 16th century as a derbend in the nahiya (district) of Jadar. It was administratively included in the Sanjak of Zvornik between 1521 and 1718. The village had two main settlements, that of Stari Varoš ("old town") in the hill, inhabited by Serbs, and Brod ("ship") beside the Lešnica river, inhabited by Muslims ("Turks"). As it was situated in the center of important roads (Loznica–Šabac–Zavlaka–Krupanj), it was often the location of Christian–Ottoman conflict, as in Austro-Turkish wars and the Serb uprisings. It was an important connection point of Serb rebels with Serbia during the Herzegovina uprising (1875–1877). It was also known as Lješnica.

== Geography and features ==
Lešnica is located on the Drina river, between the towns of Šabac and Loznica (and located on the old Šabac–Loznica road). The Jadar river also runs through Lešnica. The rivers provide ample fishing opportunities, being rich with carp, barbel, stuka, and zelenjara. The opposite end of the village is bordered by the Vidojevica Mountain, which is relatively low (approx. 190 m (623 ft) above sea level), but its oak and beech forests provide picturesque beauty. Pheasant hunting is popular, and the hunters' club of the same name maintains the animal populations diligently. Lešnica is part of the Маčva district, close to the Bosnian border. The main attraction is Lešnica's Orthodox church located in the middle of the village.

It is not to be confused with the nearby hinterland settlement of Jadranska Lešnica (also formerly known as Begova Lešnica).

== Economy ==
The village is an economic and business center to the surrounding villages, and the main street is part of the route from Belgrade to Sarajevo. On Saturday mornings there is a market behind the fire house, where everything can be bought, from farm cheese, eggs, and livestock, to clothing, tools, electronics and Nike shoes. This is not the only opportunity to shop in Lešnica. There are butcheries, grocery shops, fishmongers, bakeries, and many other shops. The bakeries of the village (of which there are many) have a reputation for their excellent pastries, probably a result of the competition between them.

== Village center ==
There is an eighth grade primary school (Petar Tasić), a chestnut wooded park, and many shops, of which the barber shop in the main street is the oldest. In fact, it is the oldest in the country, where the same family of barbers have worked for generations. Across the road from the park and diagonally from the school is the beautiful 19th-century church of St. Peter and Paul. The church was partially destroyed by the Nazis during their occupation, but was rebuilt to provide a spiritual home for the villagers and a magnificent floodlit vista at night. The other side of the park is the location of a late 19th-century manor built by the Pejić family, who were the landlords of the settlement. It belongs to the descendants of the family, but it lies almost in ruin, as it has not been in use since the 1950s, when it was used as school after being confiscated by Communist rulers. There has been recent interest in reviving this once grand building.

== See also ==
- List of places in Serbia
- Vidin Grad

== Sources ==
Detelić, Mirjana (2007). Epski gradovi: leksikon. Balkanološki institut SANU. p. 241. ISBN 978-86-7179-040-6.
