= Vidin Grad =

Fortress in Donji Dobrić, Serbia

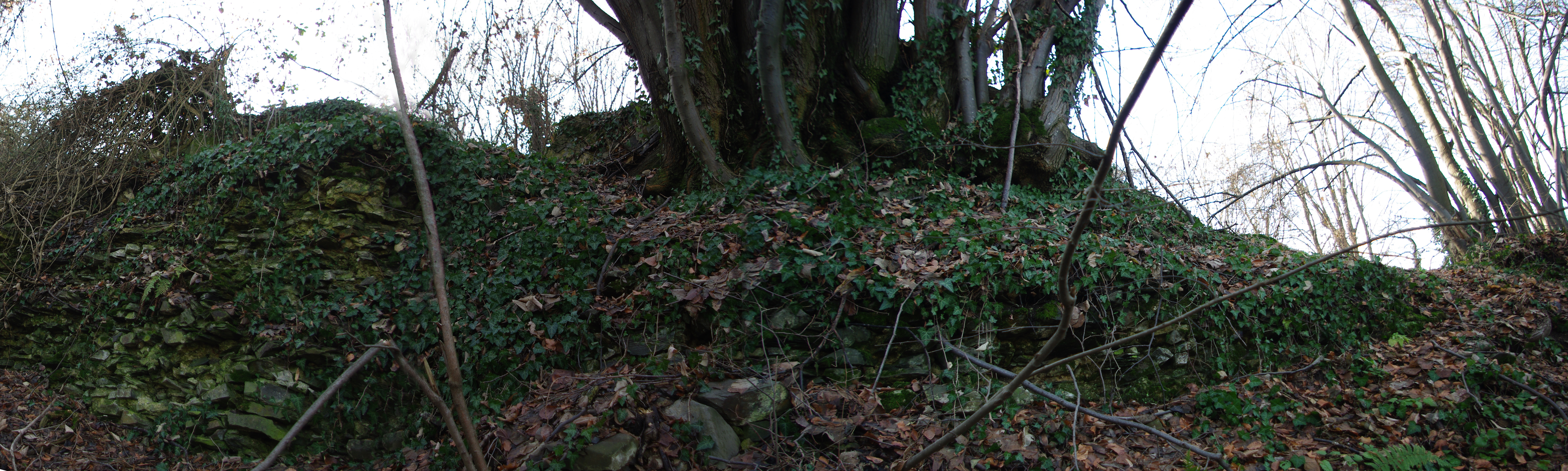
- The wall of Vidin Grad
- Interactive map of the Vidin Grad area

General information
- Type: Fortress
- Location: Donji Dobrić, Serbia
- Coordinates: 44.6325°N 19.335556°E

Dimensions
- Diameter: 50 m (160 ft)

Vidin Grad was a fortress, located at the top of the Vidojevica hill, near village Lešnica, municipality of Loznica,

Today, little remain of fortification walls and towers which are spreading on the top of the hill, on a plateau with rough dimensions of 50 m diameter. From it, the terrain steep drops on all sides to dry ditch, which is spreading around the entire fortress to protected the access to it.

Remains of walls, made of roughly trimmed stone, are largely covered with vegetation, and their original thickness is estimated at 100 cm. They were reinforced with at least two towers, whose ruins can be seen on the ground.

== See also ==
- Koviljkin grad
- Trojanov Grad
- Gensis (vicus)

== Gallery ==
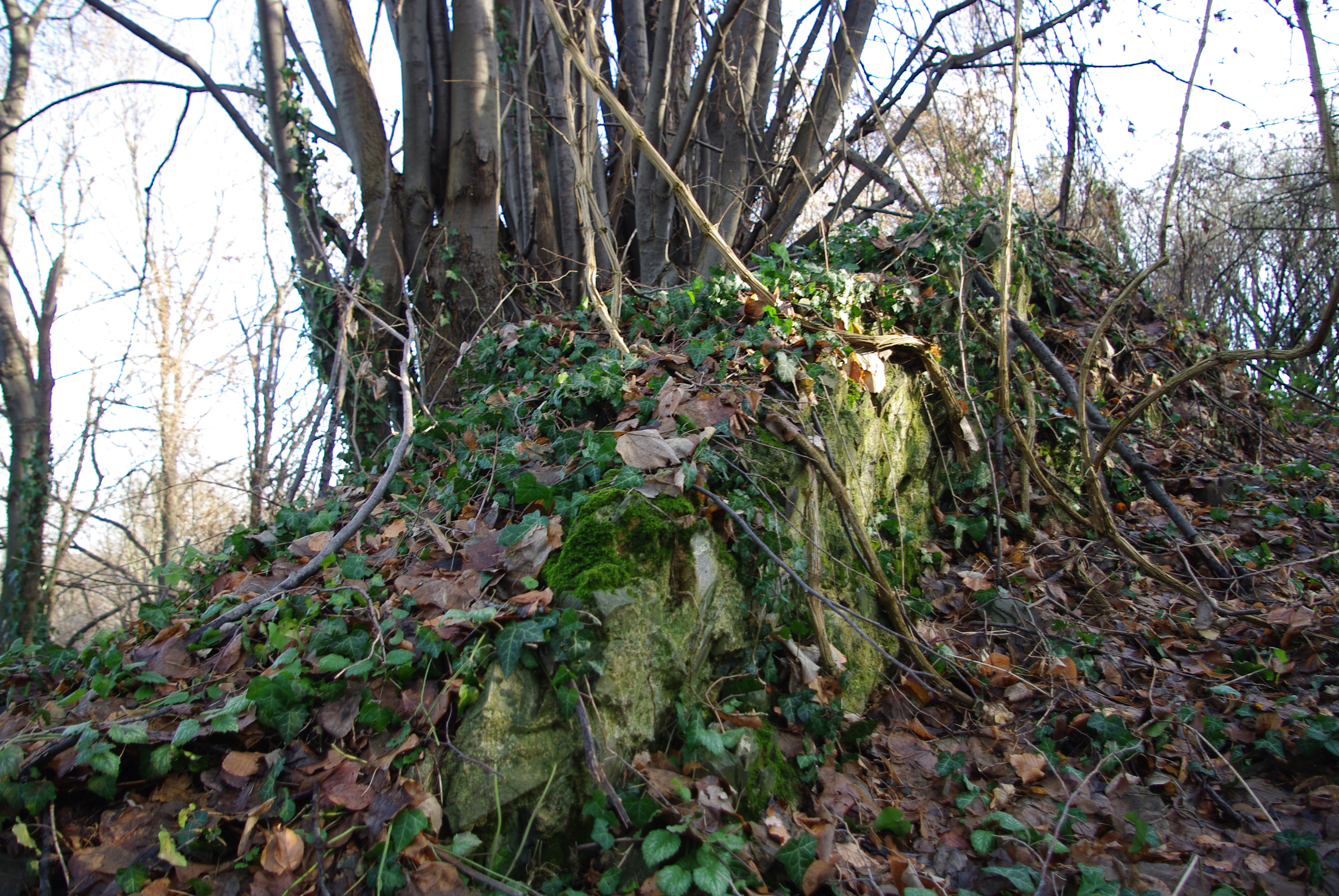
One of the walls at the Vidin Grad

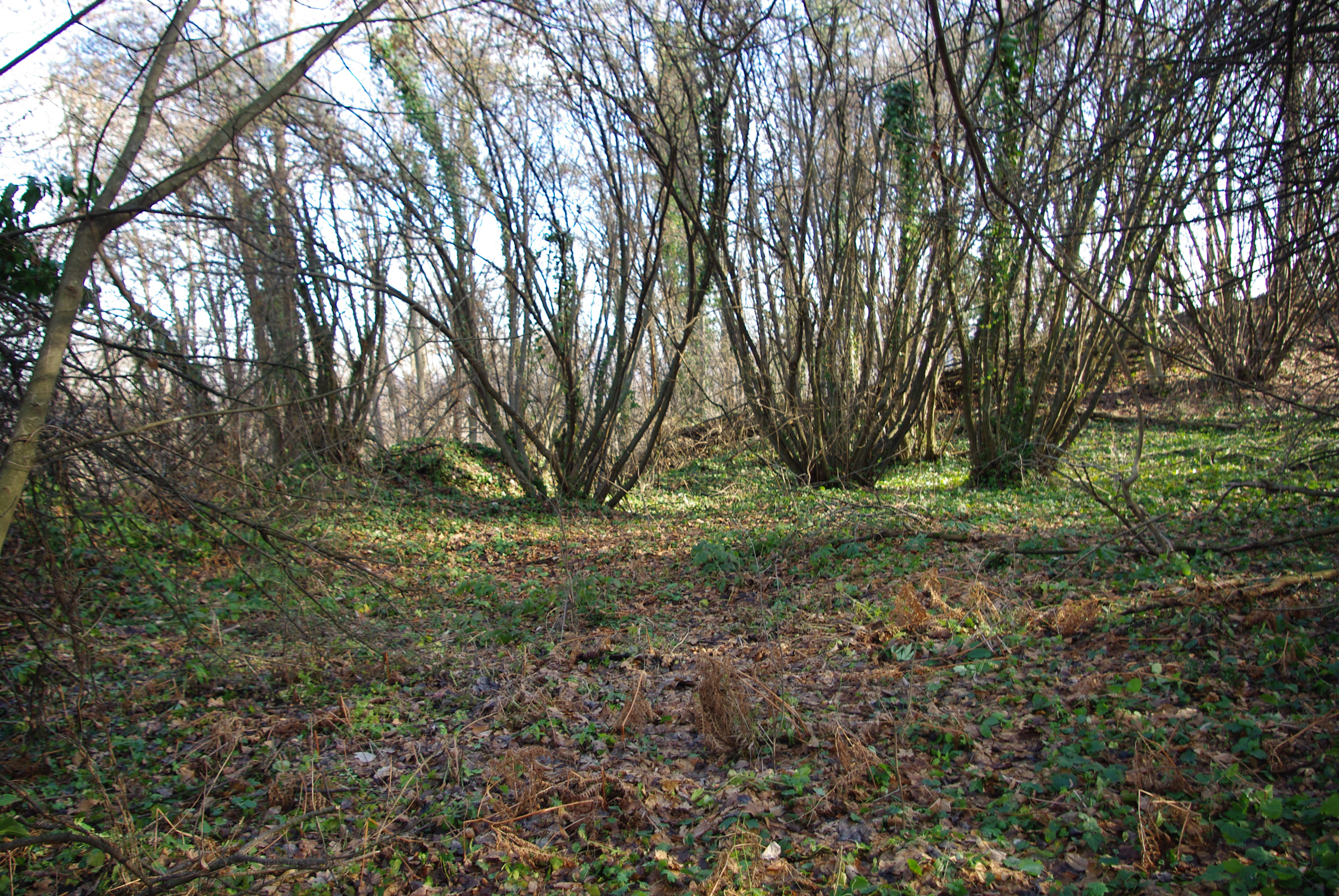
Plateau at the top of the hill

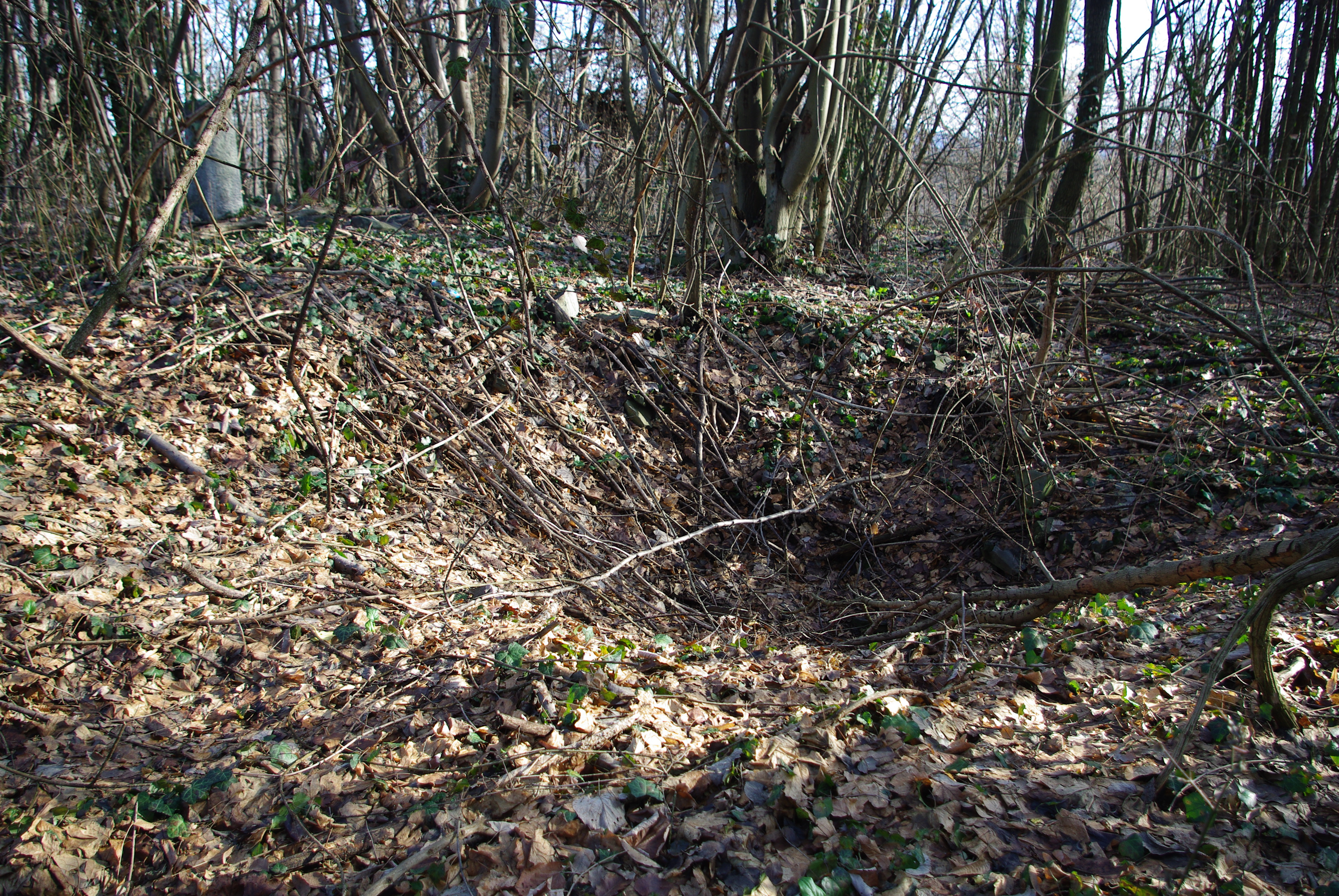
The base of one of the towers

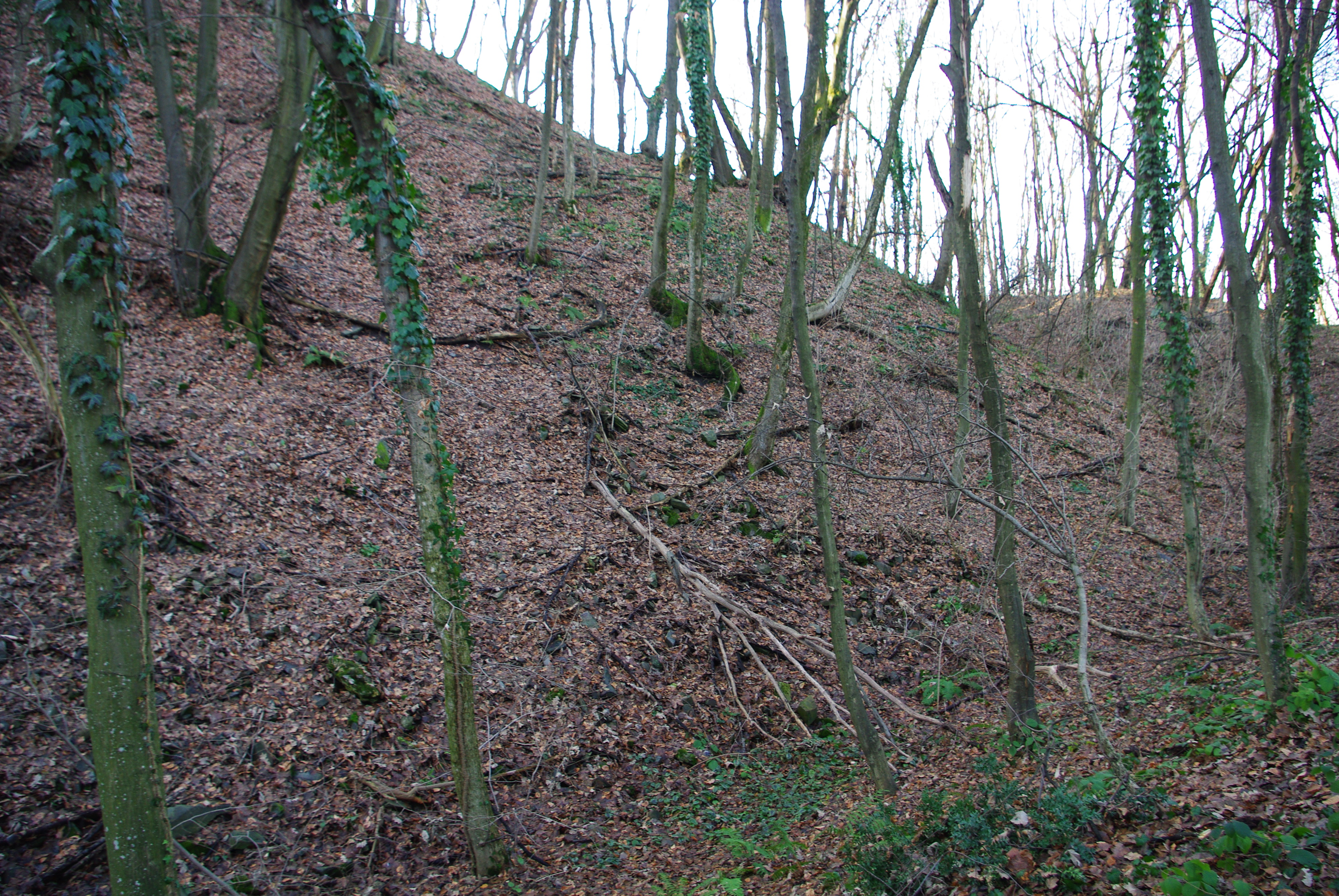
Lower part of the fortress Vidin Grad with a ditch
