= Joševa =

Joševa may refer to:

- Joševa (Bratunac), Bosnia and Herzegovina
- Joševa (Loznica), Serbia
- Joševa (Valjevo), Serbia
