= Joševa (Valjevo) =

Joševa Јошева
- Village (Selo)
- Location within Serbia
- Coordinates: 44°21′N 19°50′E
- Country: Serbia
- District: Kolubara District
- Municipality: Valjevo

Population (2002)
  - Total: 272
- Time zone: UTC+1 (CET)
  - Summer (DST): UTC+2 (CEST)

Joševa is a village in the municipality of Valjevo, Serbia. According to the 2002 census, the village has a population of 272 people.

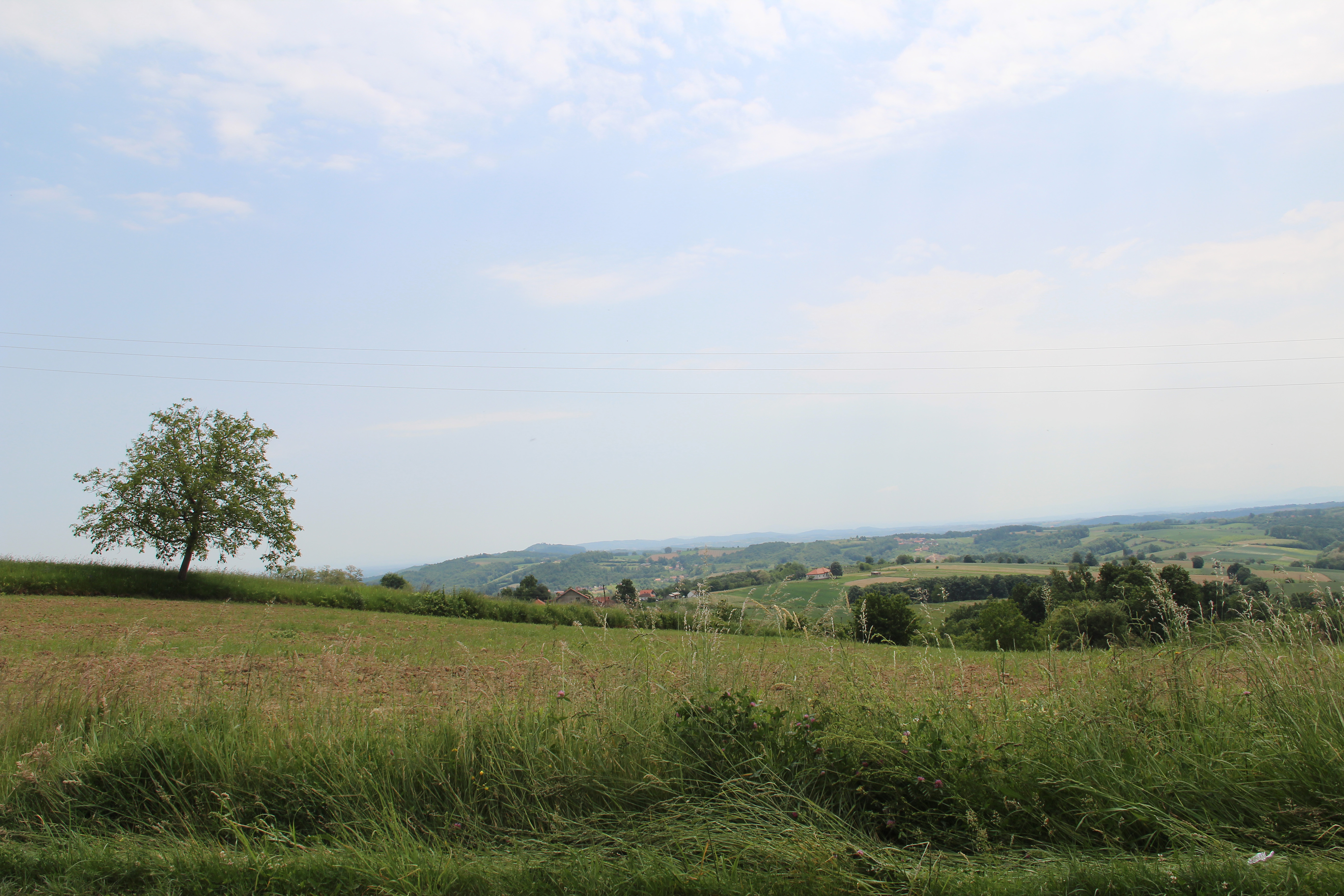
Joseva - panorama

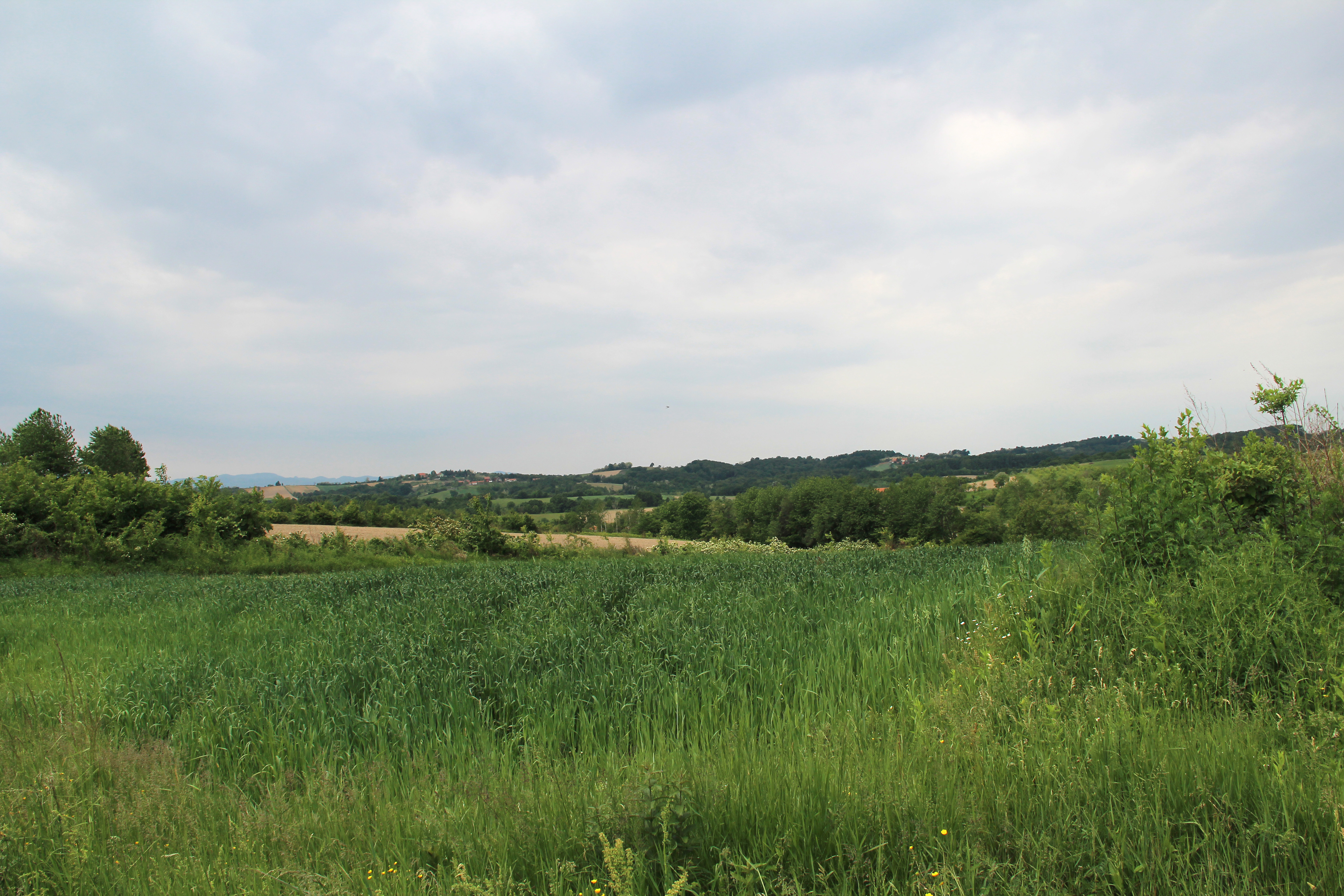
Joseva - panorama

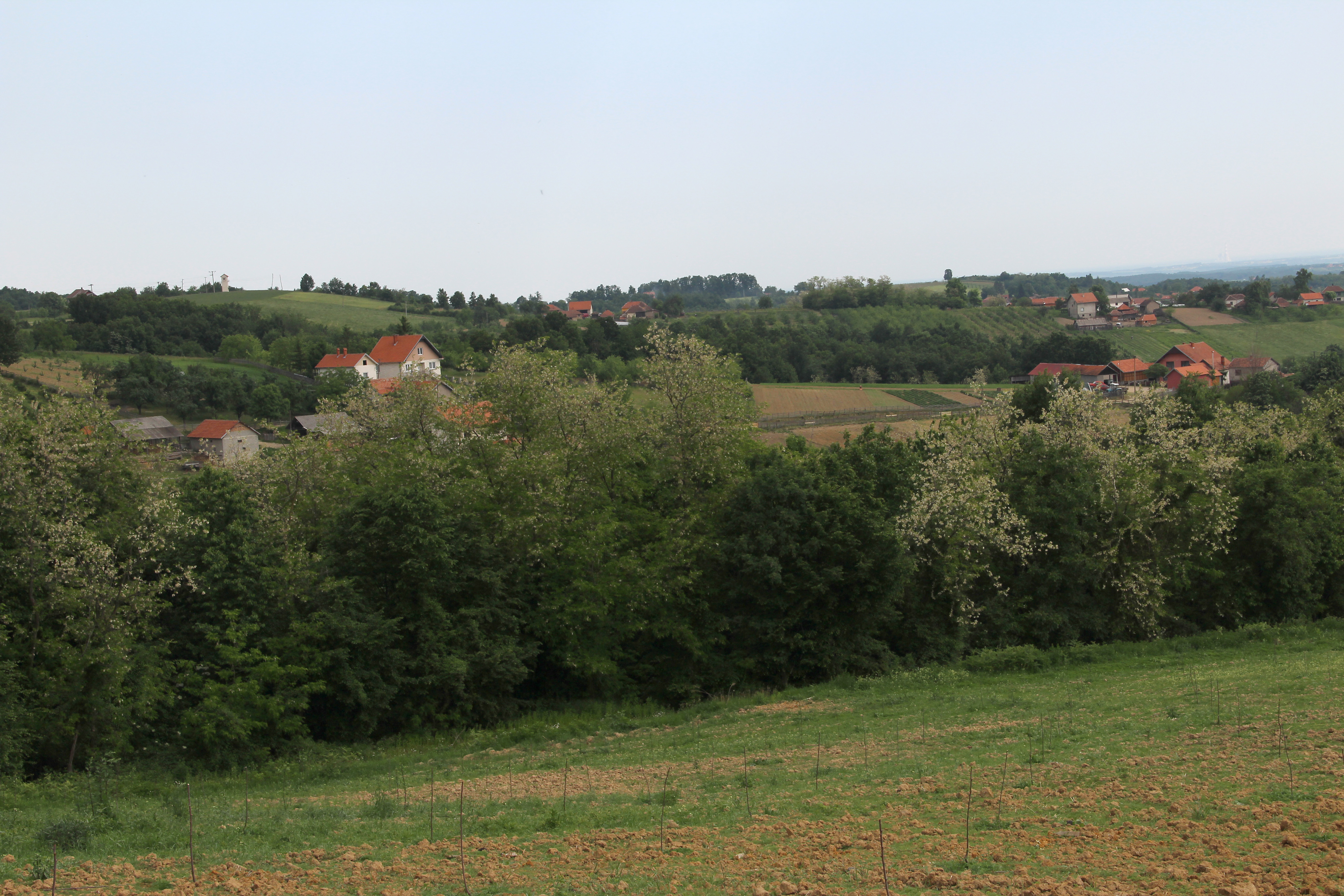
Joseva - panorama

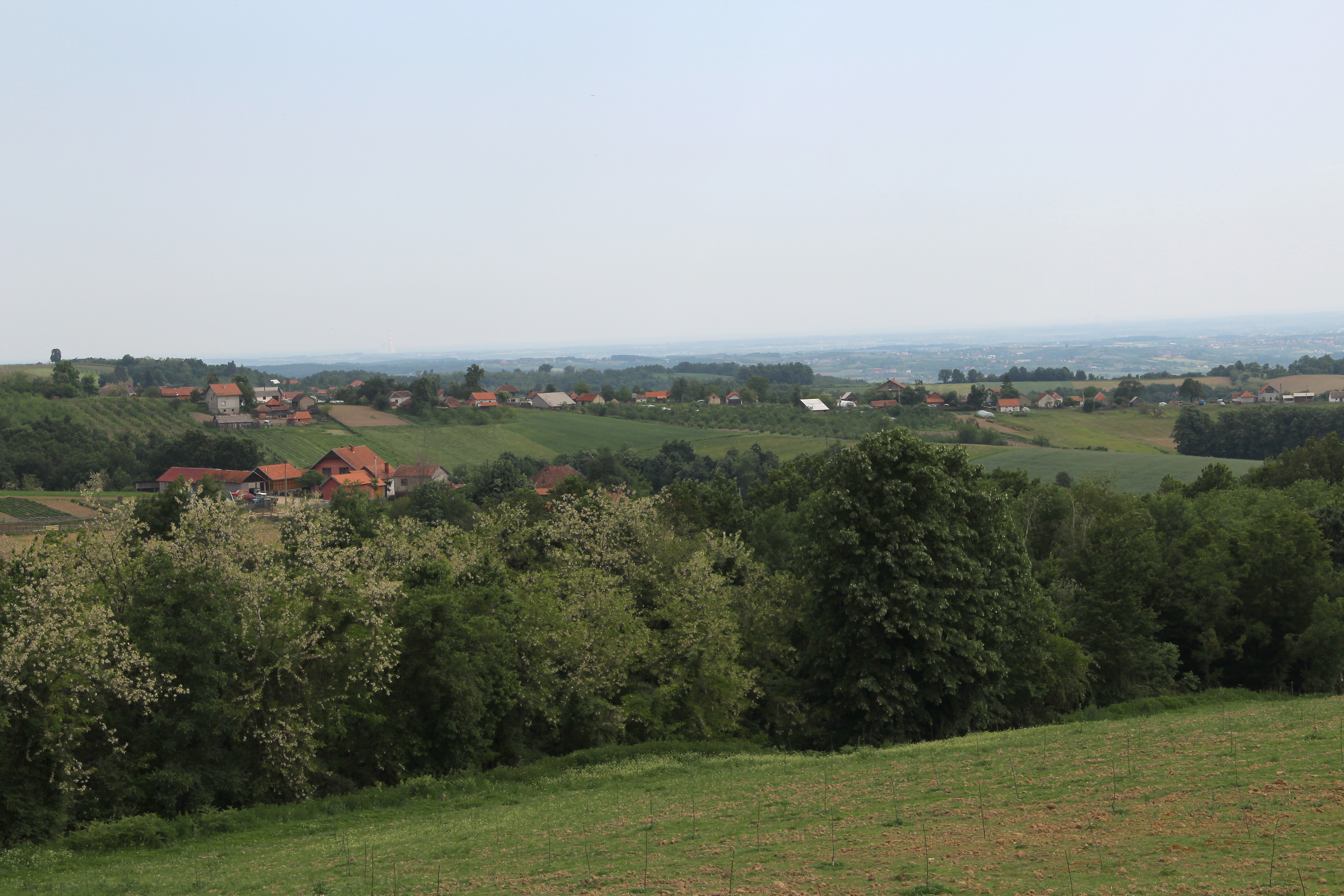
Joseva - panorama

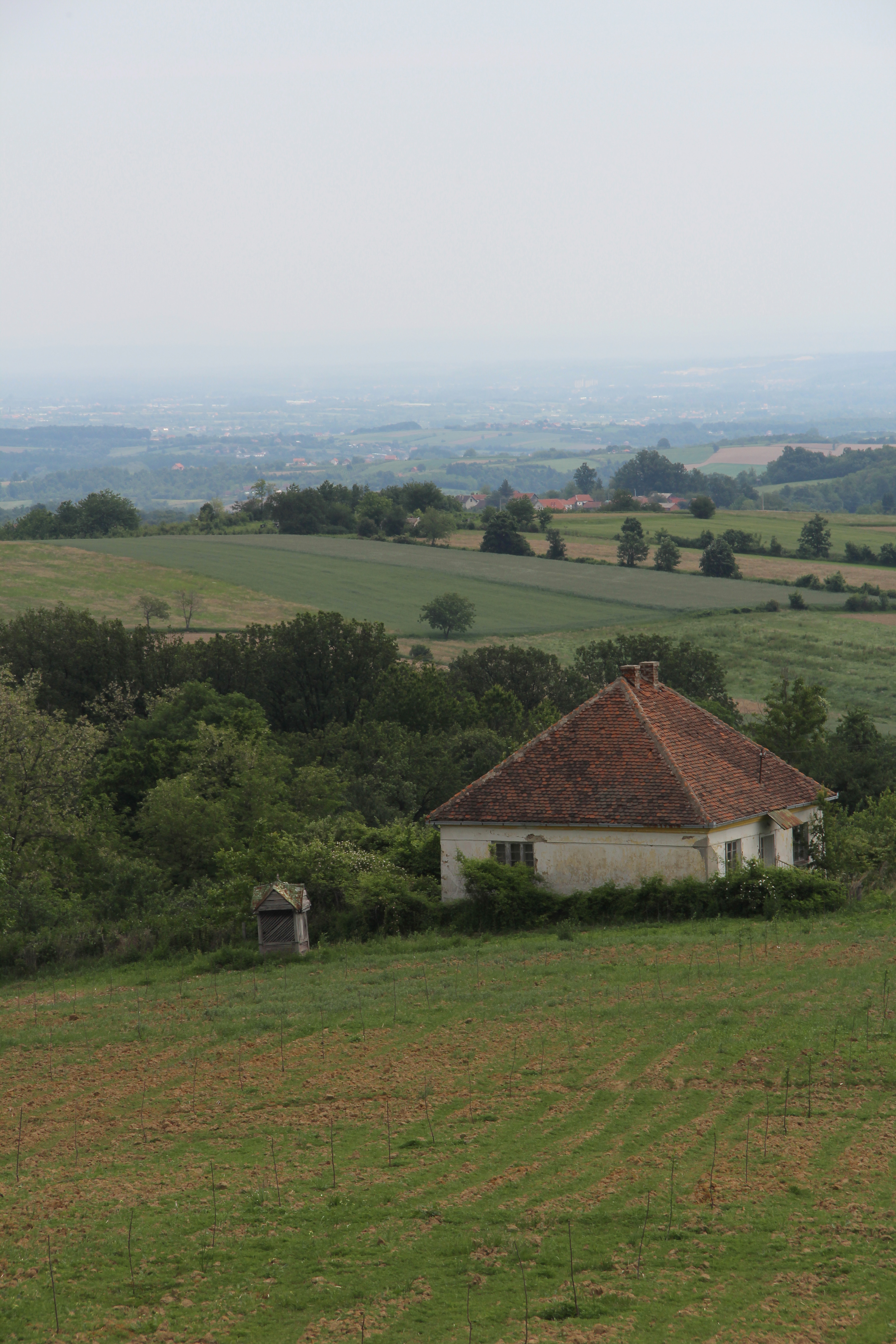
Joseva - panorama

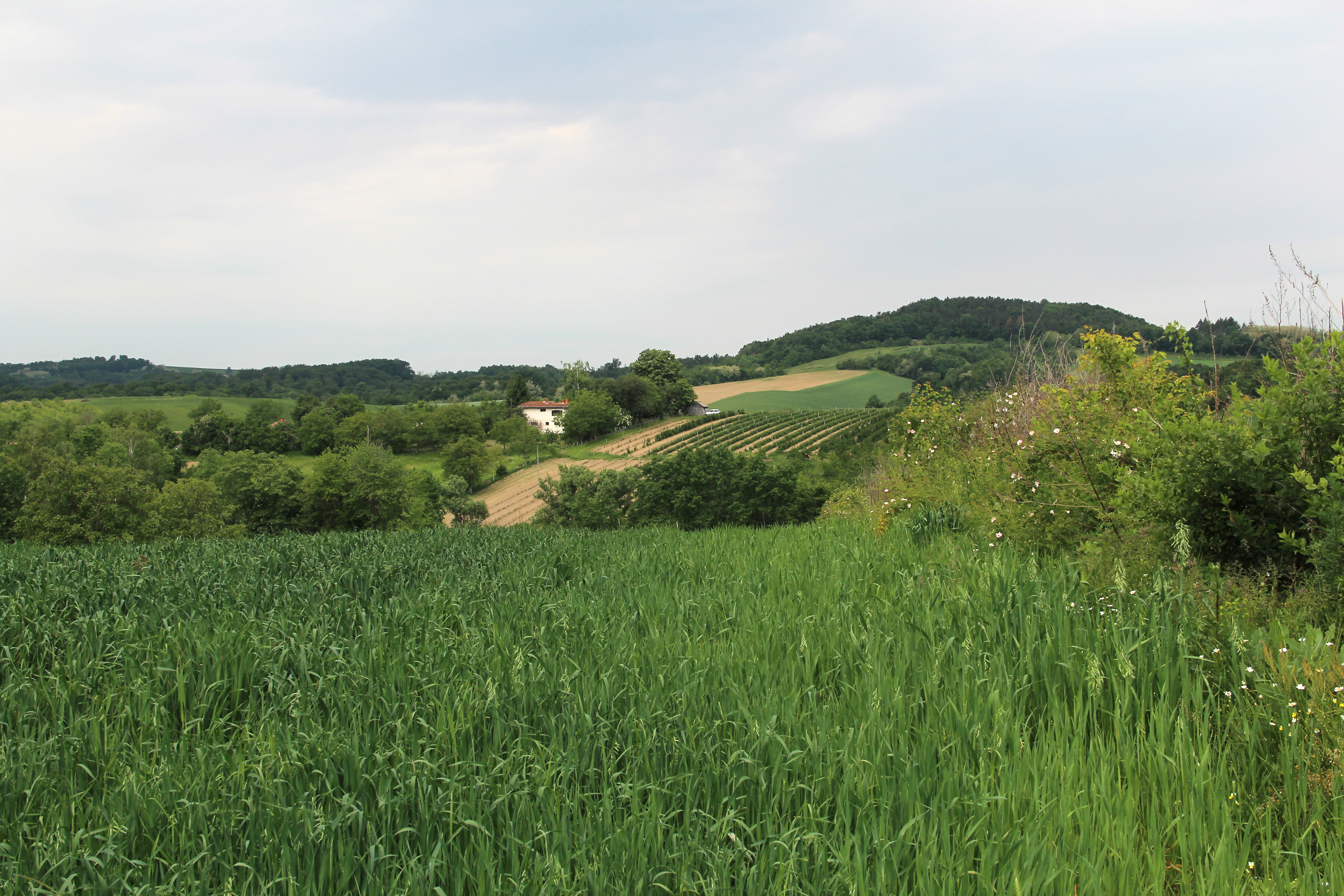
Joseva - panorama

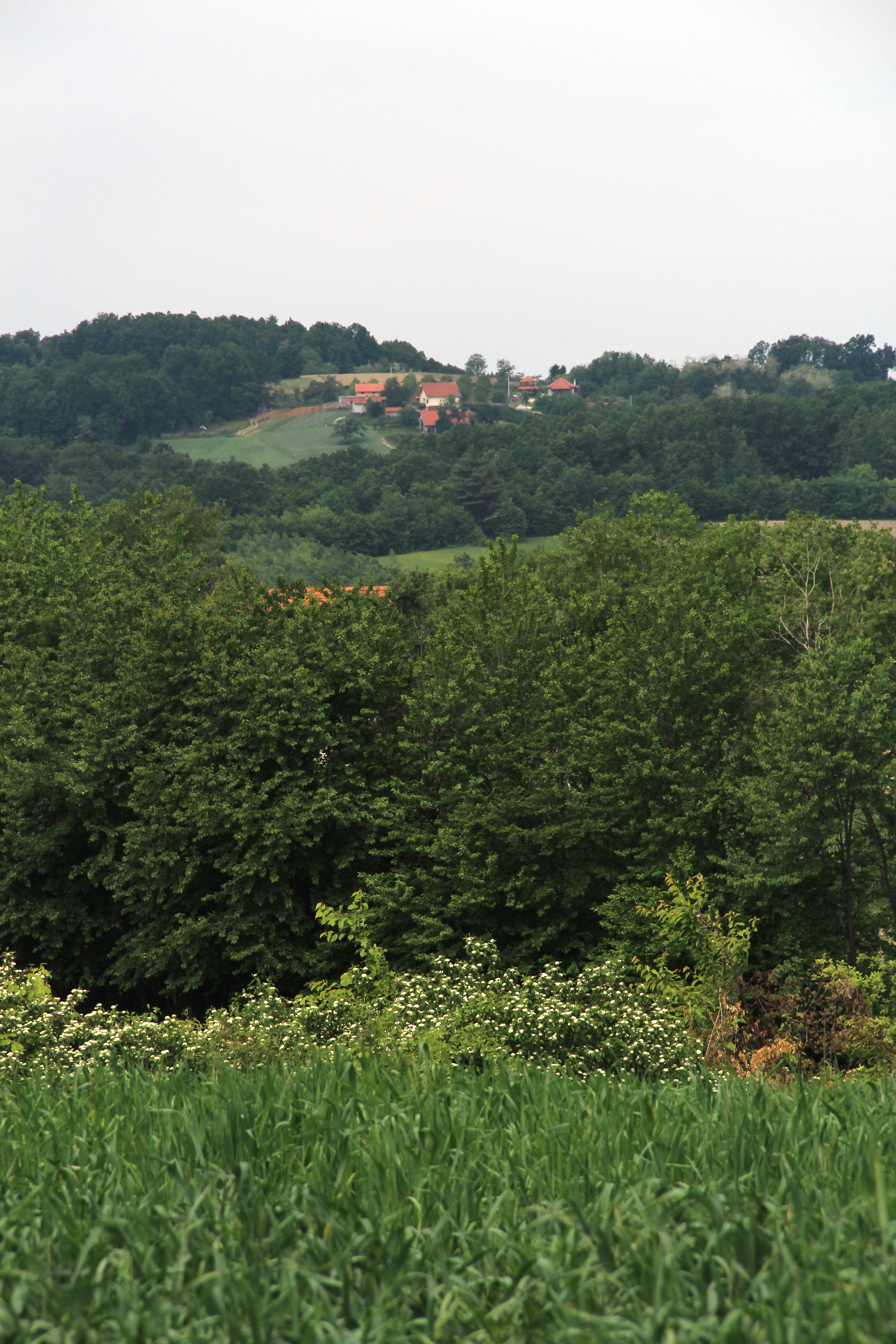
Joseva - panorama
