= Battles of Podrinje (1808) =

- Part of First Serbian Uprising
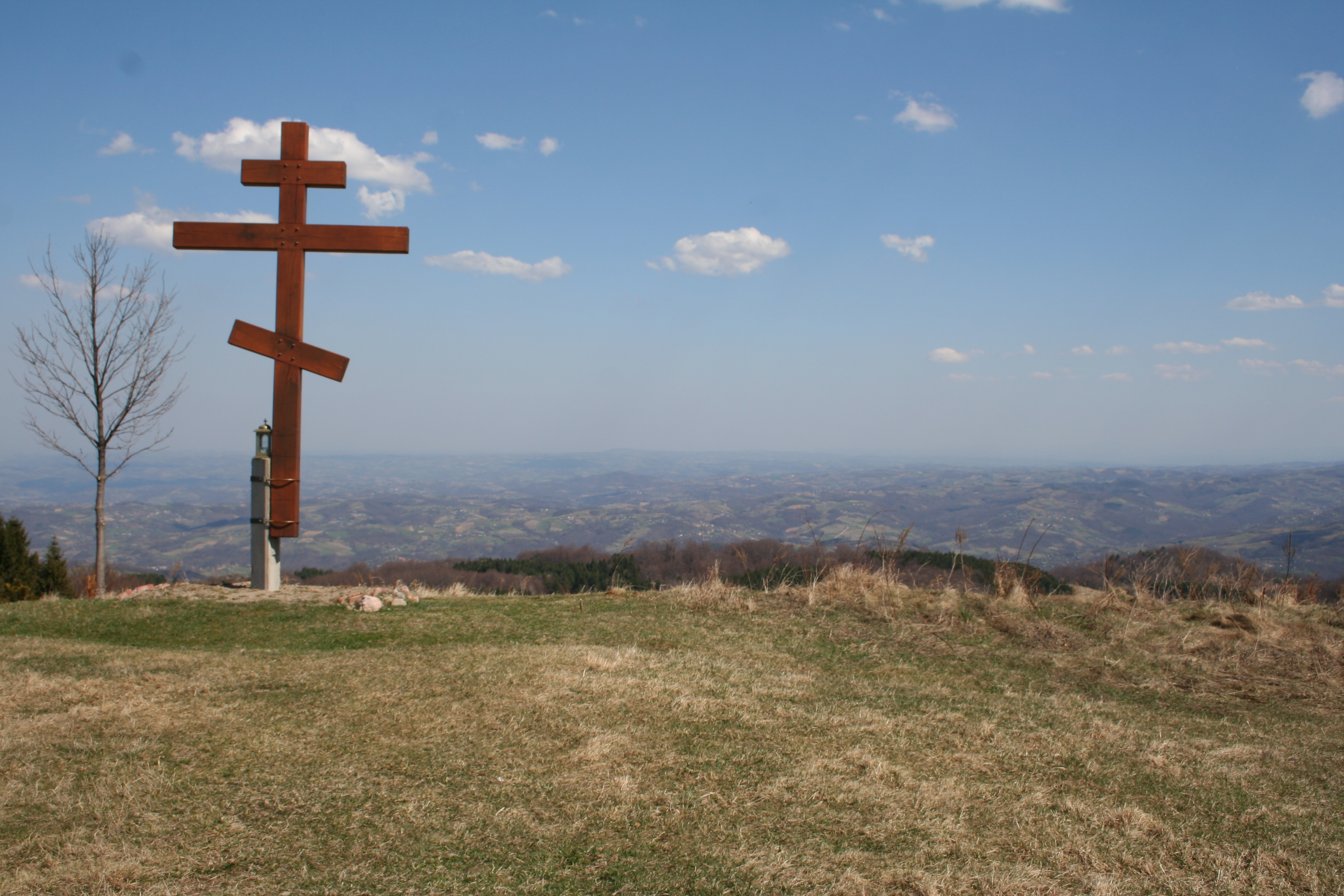
- View from the St. Vasilije of Ostrog monastery on Rožanj
- Location: Sanjak of Zvornik, Ottoman Empire
- Commanded by: Anta Bogićević, Krsta Ignjatović and Petar Moler; Ali Bey Vidajić, Hasan Pasha and Hadji Sali Bey
- Objective: Liberation of Soko, Osat and Semberija; Securing Podrinje and aiding Soko.
- Date: April–November 1808
- Executed by: Soko nahija army, Jadar and Rađevina units; Sanjak of Zvornik army, Soko garrison.
- Outcome: Inconclusive

The Battles of Podrinje were fought in 1808 by the Drina river between the Serbian rebels under the command of Anta Bogićević, Krsta Ignjatović and Petar Moler and Ottoman Bosnian army under the command of Ali Bey Vidajić, Hasan Pasha and Hadji Sali Bey.

== Background ==
In 1807, Anta Bogićević, as the main commander and governor of Podrinje, had a military cordon line stretching from the Žiča river to Soko in which he strengthened the defense towards Ottoman Bosnia. Karađorđe arrived at Loznica and with Anta inspected the Podrinje region where trenches were to be set up. At Loznica, a double sconce (šarampov or šanac) in the town was built surrounded by sconces on three surrounding hills. Sconces were built at the Tičar field, the Jadar river island, Rožanj hill towards Soko, and several by the Drina, and shortly after also at Jarebice above Loznica, at the height of Kostajnik, and the Jagodnja hill.

A Russian–Ottoman peace treaty was signed that stretched from September 1807 to 1 April 1808. The Bosnian Vizier asked that the ceasefire also include the Serbian rebels.

In December 1807, a Russian news article claimed that Karađorđe, "leader of rebels of Serbia and Bosnia", set out to take Sarajevo, and this rebel action was also mentioned by the London Times. That same month, Austria prohibited the export of lead, which forced the rebels to manufacture it and cannons themselves.

A rebel army of 12,000 infantry and 6,000 cavalry were stationed near Užice at the beginning of 1808. It threatened the Bosnia Eyalet with invasions over the Drina. A rebel attack was believed to have been planned to be carried out via Serb-inhabited Nova Varoš and Višegrad, and another on Bijeljina.

== History ==
According to French consul at Travnik, Pierre David, some rebel detachments made incursions into Bosnia until early March 1808, reaching "six hours" from Sarajevo; apart from Višegrad, their main goal was to attack Zvornik. In mid-March 1808, the Sultan's ferman (decree) arrived which called on "all Bosnian Turks able to carry arms" for mobilization. The Bosnian Vizier ordered for the readying of all 37 Bosnian captaincies, with 1,000 soldiers each (37,000 men). During the mobilization, arms of Bosnian Christians were confiscated until mid-April. The ceasefire ended by April, and conflicts began along the Drina.

In the Travnik divan held on 15 April 1808, the Sultan's ferman on war against Serbs was read out.

At the end of April 1808, an Ottoman Bosnian contingent of 1,000 men crossed Zvornik into Soko. In early May 1808, two Ottoman Bosnian contingents crossed the Drina, the first at Ljubovija and the second at Zvornik. The two united in Serbian Podrinje and went towards Soko, and on the way were reinforced by 1,000 of the Soko garrison and attacked the Selenac trench where they were defeated, and the Soko garrison then returned to Soko. The Soko garrison increased their activity throughout the year, and often looted villages in the area, but they were often blocked and decimated.

In springtime 1808, Russian engineering major Gramberger arrived in Serbia and inspected fortifications along the Drina front, from Mačva to Rača Monastery.

Serbian rebel activity on the Drina was continued in August 1808, with units operating around Srebrenica, readying for the breakthrough to Sarajevo. Serb attacks on the lower Drina until the end of October 1808 had the goal of liberating the Semberija settlements of Janja and Bijeljina.

=== Krupanj ===
Ali Bey Vidajić from the Sanjak of Zvornik quietly crossed the Drina with 1,500 soldiers and entrenched at Krupanj. Anta Bogićević, vojvoda Krsta Ignjatović and vojvoda Milić Kedić with 1,200 men attacked, and a fierce battle at Krupanj (Serbian: на Крупњу) was fought in the night, which left many killed and many wounded in the Bosnian army, forcing them to retreat back over the Drina prior to sunrise. P. Radovanović dated this battle at Krupanj to 1807, while S. Obradović (1873) and V. Stojančević (2004) dated it to 1808.

=== Soko, Srebrenica, Rožanj ===
The vojvoda of Soko nahija, Petar Moler, went with his army and attacked Soko, but the Soko Turks managed to repress him from the fortress. Moler decided to go with 5,000 over the Drina at the Sikirić skela (ferry) and burnt down and looted some Muslim villages above the Srebrenica fortress and town. A 14,000-strong Bosnian army under Hasan Pasha and Hadji Sali Bey of Srebrenica gathered nearby. Moler was reinforced by a strong reinforcement unit from Serbia and destroyed the Srebrenica army. Hasan Pasha took a strong detachment and crossed into Serbian Podrinje, then pushed out the rebels from two trenches at the Drina, then went to Rožanj where he attacked vojvoda Krsta Ignjatović who was entrenched there. Anta Bogićević arrived with his men at the trench, and Moler arrived with his men in the rear of Hasan Pasha. The battle at Rožanj (Serbian: на Рожњу) was fought without pause for three days, where Anta Bogićević, Petar Moler and Krsta Ignjatović destroyed a large army led by Hasan Pasha and Sali Bey, during an encirclement of Rožanj. At Rožanj, vojvoda Milić Kedić was saved from encirclement by the Valjevo army. Hasan Pasha's army was destroyed and pursued to the Drina, where many died. Milovan Grbović became sick while at Rožanj and returned home, where he died.

=== Rađevo polje ===
On 4 October 1808, the Bosnian Vizier crossed the Drina into Rađevina with 15,000 soldiers and many cannons and camped at Rađevo polje. Anta Bogićević and his sub-commanders informed Karađorđe, who was in the Valjevo nahija, that a Bosnian army had camped there, and asked for support to defeat it. Karađorđe quickly arrived with 15 cannons and the Serbian rebel army numbering 16,000 attacked the Vizier, with the battle taking two days, and the Bosnian army retreating across the Drina. The Ottoman Bosnian army had many dead, while the rebels reportedly had only 20 dead. Anta Bogićević distinguished himself in the battle.

=== Žiča ===
Immediately after Rađevo polje, Karađorđe and his personal guard of a low number clashed with Hasan Pasha with 10,000 men at Žiča, with Karađorđe's guard destroyed. That Bosnian army set out towards Loznica, but they were intercepted by Anta Bogićević leading a couple thousands troops. The Bosnian army was pressured and harassed and forced to retreat to Bosnia.

== See also ==
- Timeline of the Serbian Revolution
- Serbian Army (revolutionary)

== Sources ==
- Nenadović, Konstantin N. (1884). Живот и дела великог Ђорђа Петровића Кара-Ђорђа. Vol. II (1 ed.). Vienna: У Штампарији Јована Н. Вернаја – via Google Books.
- Obradović, Stojan (1873). Живот и радња заслужних Срба из окружија шабачког и подринског у књажеству Србији у устанцима противу насиља турског од 1804. и 1815. године: у два одељка. Stefanović.
- Ristanović, Slobodan (1971). Ustanička Rađevina: prilozi za hroniku. Istorijski arhiv.
- Stojančević, Vladimir (2004). Србија и српски народ у време првог устанка. Матица српска. ISBN 978-86-83651-41-2.
- Teinović, Bratislav (2020). "Преглед српско-турског ратовања на Дрини (1804-1815)" (PDF). Војноисторијски гласник. 2. Институт за стратегијска истраживања: 9–35.
- Vasiljević, Milivoje (2001). Соко - Град. Јанус.
