= Anta Bogićević =

Serbian commander

- Анта Богићевић
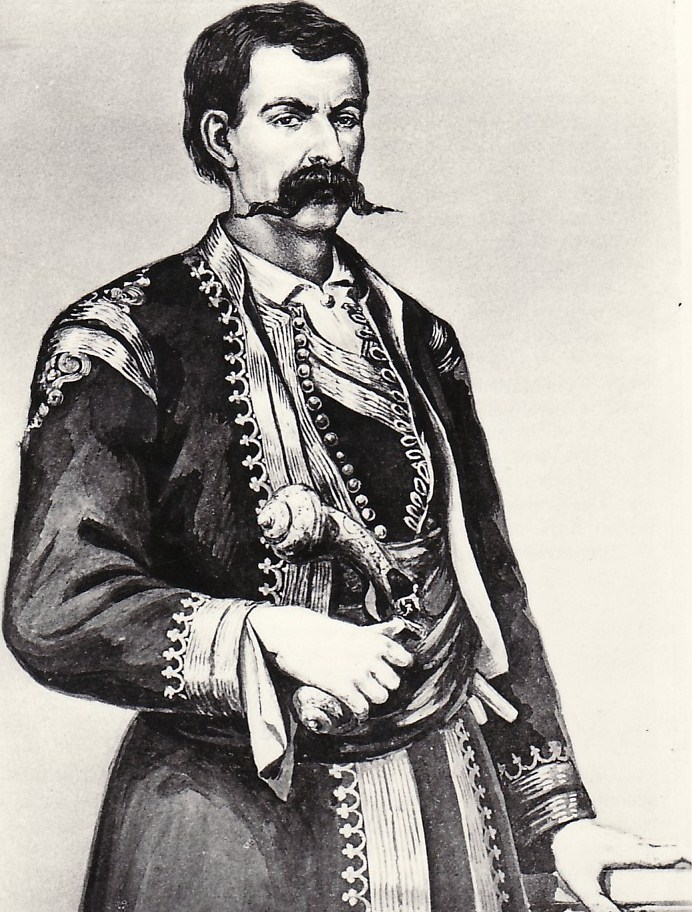
- Born: Antonije Bogićević; 1750s Klupci, Sanjak of Zvornik
- Died: End of April 1813; Loznica, Revolutionary Serbia
- Children: 2
- Military career
- Allegiance: Revolutionary Serbia
- Service years: 1804–13
- Rank: vojvoda (general)
- Nickname: Anta
- Unit: Drina
- Commands: Podrinje
- Conflicts: First Serbian Uprising

Antonije Bogićević (Serbian: Антоније Богићевић; c. 1758–1813), known by the hypocorism Anta (Анта), was a Serbian vojvoda (general) during the First Serbian Uprising (1804–1813), mostly active around Loznica and by the Drina river.

== Life ==
=== Early life ===
Bogićević was born in the village of Klupci near Loznica in c. 1759. The village was part of the Jadar knežina (Serb self-governing village group). He grew up working in agriculture, and later became a cattle trader with his relative Đorđe Cerović, who was a notable merchant in the area. The village chose Anta to become a kmet (serf), as he was the most capable, mindful and reasonable, who had the respect and trust of the villagers. In the Sanjak of Smederevo ("Belgrade Pashalik"), the renegade Janissaries known as the Dahije had wrested power in 1801.

=== 1804 ===
The uprising against the Dahije broke out in the Belgrade Pashalik in February 1804, while Jadar and Rađevina were part of the Sanjak of Zvornik. The Dahije were supported by Ali-paša Vidajić of the Sanjak of Zvornik against the Serbian rebels that attacked the towns of Valjevo and Šabac in springtime 1804. In the beginning, rebel leader Karađorđe sought to limit operations to the Belgrade Pashalik, and Jadar and Rađevina remained outside missions, until the right moment presented itself to adjoin these areas.

Ali-paša Vidajić, who also held land tenure (spahiluk) in Jadar and Rađevina, threatened the kmets (serfs) of Jadar and Rađevina with death if they supported the uprising, and appointed Anta to ensure order; a truce was negotiated on the conditions that Turks from Krupanj, Loznica and Lipnica never enter and disturb Serb villages and that Ali-paša's army never cross Jadar and Rađevina to fight the Serbian rebels, both cases resulting in the disturbance of the areas, and Ali-paša gave his word. Anta secretly met with local knezes and notables, such as Jevta Čotrić, whom he tasked with readying and carefully arming the people for uprising, awaiting the call of Karađorđe, and all swore oath to ready for uprising and to keep it a secret. He secretly met with vojvoda (general) Jakov Nenadović, the main rebel leader in the Valjevo nahiya, regarding this, and Jakov thanked Anta for ensuring that the area was not used by the Ottoman Bosnian army against the Serbian rebels, and that he therefore did not need to put up trenches and sentinels towards Jadar and Rađevina. Anta left his son Boja with Jakov, to be educated.

On 26 June [O.S. 14 June] 1804, the hajduk leader (harambaša) Đorđe Ćurčija, falling out with supreme leader Karađorđe following the takeover of Požarevac in late May, decided to go to Šabac and Mačva where he removed the administration put there by Jakov Nenadović and appointed his own people. From Mačva, Ćurčija raided Podrinje (part of the Sanjak of Zvornik) and rose the Serbs of the region. Ćurčija crossed into Jadar on 15 July 1804, and dispersed all Turks from the area, and burnt down Ottoman mansions. In Jadar, hajduk Todor Bojinović from Gornji Dobrić, hajduk Sima Sarić from Cikote, Gavrilo Caklen from Jadranska Lešnica, and monk Đunisije of the Tronoša monastery untimely began rallying people, who supported immediate rebellion, and called Anta a "Turk bootlicker" and slandered him to Karađorđe. Ćurčija sent a detachment to Loznica which took over the town without a fight, and another to Lješnica, which was taken after a hard battle. Ali-paša retook Loznica and Lješnica after defeating Todor Bojinović in the Ranitovača forest. Ćurčija's rebels failed to retake Loznica in another attempt. Ćurčija also had a quarrel with Luka Lazarević.

After defeating the Dahije, Karađorđe sent Anta Bogićević with Jevta Čotrić to conclude a peace treaty with Zvornik leader Mehmed-paša Vidajić (Ali-paša's uncle and rival), which was signed, but short-lived.

=== 1807 ===
In late 1807, the Serbian rebels held all of the Belgrade Pashalik, and with Russian diplomatic and military support, Karađorđe ordered for the expansion of uprising and attacks on Sjenica, Nova Varoš and Srebrenica. In February 1808, Karađorđe sent vojvoda Jakov of the Valjevo nahija and vojvoda Luka Lazarević of the Šabac nahija to take all of Jadar and Rađevina. Anta's son Boja was in Jakov's army, as well as those four who had slandered Anta. Setting out, Jakov received a letter from Karađorđe to kill the "Turk bootlickers" Anta and his followers following the takeover of Loznica. At unease, and blaming himself for not having explained his relation to Anta, Jakov asked Luka and his scribe Lazar Teodorović on what to do, but they had no words. Outside Badanja, ten cavalrymen of Anta approached Jakov and asked him to come to Anta's camp in Badanja where all was prepared for their army and where 700–800 men waited to join them. At Badanja, Anta told Jakov that he had promised the Loznica Turks to let them go safely to Bosnia in case of a planned rebel attack, and Jakov approved of this, as it would save them from bloodshed. The next day, Anta spoke to the Loznica Turks who then left the town in the night. The day after that, on Theodore's Saturday, the Serbian rebel army entered Loznica. Jakov arrested Anta and Čotrić and asked the Jadar men to choose their starešina (chief), upon which all in unison chose Anta, and when Jakov said that they had to choose someone else, they told him it was Anta or nobody, and that they would all settle in Bosnia if this was not accepted. Now, Jakov showed them Karađorđe's letter, and they told him that Anta had protected them for four years, and stopped the crossing of the Ottoman army through their area, and that Anta should be rewarded for this. As Anta had clearly not been a "Turk bootlicker", and was supported by his people, Jakov sent a letter to Karađorđe explaining this, and Karađorđe replied with that he wanted what the people wanted, and included a diploma for Anta, elevating him to vojvoda (general) of the Podrinje region. Anta appointed the following buljubaša of Jadar: Todor Bojinović, Sima Sarić, Gavrilo Caklen, Trivun, Tešan, and Marko Gvozdenović from Pomijača. Jakov allegedly eventually regretted not giving Bojinović the vojvoda command, as according to V. Karadžić, Anta was "soft, more of a kmet (serf) than a soldier".

=== Podrinje command ===
Anta, as the main commander and governor of Podrinje, had a military cordon line stretching from the Žiča river to Soko in which he strengthened the defense towards Ottoman Bosnia. Karađorđe arrived at Loznica and with Anta inspected the Podrinje region where trenches were to be set up. At Loznica, a double sconce (šarampov or šanac) in the town was built surrounded by sconces on three surrounding hills. Karađorđe gifted Anta a noble horse (hata) with barding and then went to the Serbian interior. Sconces were built at the Tičar field, the Jadar river island, Rožanj hill towards Soko, and several by the Drina, and shortly after also at Jarebice above Loznica, at the height of Kostajnik, and the Jagodnja hill.

The Ottoman Bosnian army, most often under Ali-paša Vidajić (who also wanted revenge on Anta), crossed the Drina many times but was defeated and pushed back to Bosnia by the Podrinje army under Anta. Bogićević was stationed mostly at Loznica or was active by the Drina river, having many fights with Ottoman armies at Krupanj, Rožanj, Rađevo polje and often at Loznica. The first large battle was in Krupanj in 1808, when Ali-paša quietly crossed the Drina with 1,500 soldiers and entrenched at Krupanj; Anta, Krsta and Milić Kedić with 1,200 men attacked and killed and wounded many. The next large battle was at the Rožanj hill, in the same year.

Todor Bojinović went to Belgrade in fall 1808 and requested the command of the right side of the Jadar, but he was accused of crime by the Governing Council, perhaps with Anta's involvement.

Anta participated at the bloody victory at Loznica (17–18 October 1810). The 1811–12 years were calmer. Bogićević was ordered by Karađorđe to put himself under the command of Luka Lazarević in March 1813. At the beginning of April 1813 some serfs (kmet) complained about Bogićević. He died at the end of the month. Karađorđe appointed Bogićević's son Bogosav as a commander of a supportive band to Lazarević.

Anta was buried in a trench in Loznica where he had fought countlessly, according to his own wish. When the Ottomans retook Loznica that same year, they dug up his body, sent the head to Zvornik and threw the body in the nearby wetland. His grandson Mihailo Bogićević erected a tombstone in 1885–86.

His daughter Tomanija married Jevrem Obrenović.

== Legacy ==
Songs of his heroic exploits were sung by the famous guslar (epic poet) Filip Višnjić, such as in Boj na Loznici.

There is a public school in Serbia named after him.

== See also ==
- List of people of the First Serbian Uprising
- Serbian Army (revolutionary)
- Timeline of the Serbian Revolution

== Sources ==
- Đurđev, Aleksandar (2001) [1997], "Istorijski razvoj Krupnja", Crkve Krupnja [Churches of Krupanj], Janus; Rastko
- Ilić, Mikica (15 February 2017). "Đorđe Obradović – Ćurčija, Karađorđev ustanik iz Bosuta". M novine (791). Sremska Mitrovica: 35–41 – via Academia.edu.
- Milićević, Milan Đ. (1888). Поменик знаменитих људи у српског народа новијега доба. Издање Чупићеве задужбине – via Archive.org.
- Nenadović, Konstantin N. (1884). Живот и дела великог Ђорђа Петровића Кара-Ђорђа. Vol. II (1 ed.). Vienna: У Штампарији Јована Н. Вернаја – via Google Books.
- Obradović, Stojan (1873). Живот и радња заслужних Срба из окружија шабачког и подринског у књажеству Србији у устанцима противу насиља турског од 1804. и 1815. године: у два одељка. Stefanović.
- Protić, Kosta (1893). "Ратни догађаји из првога српског устанка под Карађорђем Петровићем 1804—1813". Годишњица Николе Чупића. XIII. Državna štamparija.
- Teinović, Bratislav (2020). "Преглед српско-турског ратовања на Дрини (1804-1815)" (PDF). Војноисторијски гласник. 2. Институт за стратегијска истраживања: 9–35.
