= Ali Pasha Vidajić =

Ottoman Bosnian official

Ali-paša Vidajić
- Ali-paša Fidahić
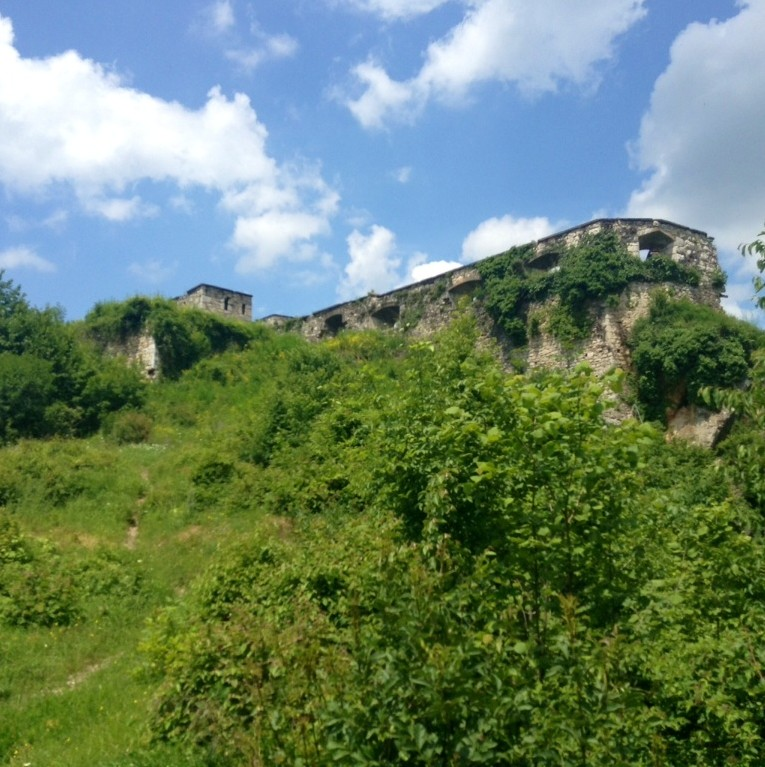
- The Zvornik fortress in Kula Grad, which was in the hands of the Fidahić family during the rule of the Ottoman Empire in Bosnia
- Born: Zvornik, Sanjak of Zvornik, Bosnia Eyalet, Ottoman Empire
- Died: 1845; Trabzon, Ottoman Empire
- Children: Jusuf-beg Fidahić (son); Mehmedali-beg Fidahić (son); Ibrahim-beg Fidahić (son)
- Relatives: Mehmed-kapetan Fidahić (uncle); Mahmud-paša Fidahić (brother); Ibrahim-beg Fidahić (grandson); Mehmed-beg Fidahić (grandson)
- Military career
- Allegiance: Ottoman Empire (1804-1831); Bosniak rebels (1831-1833)
- Service years: fl. 1804–10
- Rank: captain, bey, pasha
- Unit: Zvornik
- Conflicts: First Serbian Uprising; Second Serbian Uprising: Bosnian uprising (1831–32); Bosnian Battle of Kosovo (1831)

Ali-paša Vidajić, known by his native name Ali-paša Fidahić (fl. 1803–d. 18 October 1810), was an Ottoman Bosnian official (titled bey) and commander (with honorific pasha) in Zvornik, active during the First Serbian Uprising (1804–13), in which the Serbs of the Sanjak of Smederevo revolted against the Ottoman Empire and made incursions into Bosnia.

== Early life ==
Vidajić had a brother who was ranked an Ottoman captain, and his paternal uncle was Mehmed, also a captain. He also had a relative called Dervish Aga (fl. 1804), and another contemporary with the surname was Abd-aga Vidajić (fl. 1806), commander of the Šabac Fort. The family was of Islamized Serb origin (and retained their original surname), and belonged to the "captain families" coming from the lower class, spoke Serbo-Croatian and did not speak Turkish. Their slava (patron saint veneration) was Saint George (Đurđevdan). Ali-paša Vidajić was a çiftlik sahibi (chiflik holder) and is known to have stolen chifliks through kidnapping in Klupci in 1803.

== Career ==
=== Early career in Zvornik ===
Fidahić was a powerful pasha in the Bosnian Sanjak of Zvornik, he was a rival of the Begzadić noble family, notably Smajl-aga Begzadić from the town of Skočić, Zvornik, with whom he had a skirmish in 1825. By oral tradition of the Begzadić family Smajl-aga's life was saved by his kahvedžija (Turkish: kahveci) Hasan Čauš from being killed by Ali-paša. Smajl's son Derviš-beg fled with his mother to Derventa then to Travnik.

=== Relations with Bosniak nobility in the Sanjak of Zvornik ===
Although originally Ali-paša and Husein-kapetan were enemies since Husein supported his brother Mahmud-paša, Ali-paša became allied with the captain of the Gradačac captainate Husein-kapetan Gradaščević in 1829, after Husein supported him in his battle against his cousins over the captainate of Zvornik.

=== In Serbian historiography and poetry ===
Vidajić, while titled bey (Али-бег Видајић), supported the Janissary Dahije (that had earlier wrested the Sanjak of Smederevo) against the revolting Serbs that attacked the towns of Valjevo and Šabac in springtime 1804.

Following the Serb takeover of Valjevo on 19 March, Jakov Nenadović and Luka Lazarević besieged Šabac that was defended by the Dahije. Dahije commander Mus-aga Fočić sent a request for reinforcement and on 22 April Vidajić and kabadahija Mula Nožina crossed the Drina and arrived at Lešnica (Loznica) with thousands of troops. As they feared hajduk ambushes in the Kitog forest which was on the way to Šabac, the Ottoman Bosnian troops instead took the route towards Čokešina where they sought to fight hajduk bands and the insurgent army that temporarily assembled in the area. Hajduk harambaša Đorđe Ćurčija noted the troop movement and informed Jakov Nenadović on 25 April regarding this, at a very delicate moment. Those days, Jakov Nenadović and Mus-aga Fočić began talks about handing over Šabac to the Serbs, Fočić being unaware of the coming Bosnian reinforcement. The Čokešina Monastery was decided as an assembly point of a Serb contingent, which however quarreled, with only a portion, made up of hajduks, remaining at Čokešina. The insurgents clashed with the numerically superior Ottoman Bosnian troops under Vidajić and Nožina at a nearby hill and were completely decimated, in the Battle of Čokešina (28 April 1804). Although victorious, Vidajić and Nožina were unable to support the besieged at Šabac due to casualties and instead retreated to Lešnica and then crossed the Drina back to Bosnia. Šabac was handed over to the Serbs on 1 May 1804.

On 2 July 1804 Đorđe Ćurčija burnt down Vidajić's residences in Šurice and killed the Turks there. The sultan ordered the Viziers of Bosnia in 1805 to muster armies to attack Serbia, and they crossed the Drina and attacked Valjevo and Šabac in late January 1806. The Serb rebels managed to stop the incursion in Mačva by Mehmed-kapetan Vidajić (Ali's uncle and a captain in Zvornik). Hasan-paša Srebrenički was defeated in February and rebel leader Karađorđe's troops burnt down several towns and villages in the Podrinje area by March 1806. Serb commanders Stojan Čupić and Janko Katić destroyed Mehmed-kapetan Vidajić at Zvornik, but the Ottoman Bosnian troops quickly reassembled and stopped Serb expansion on the Bosnian side of the Drina.

The new Vizier of Bosnia, Koca Hüsrev Mehmed Pasha (t. April 1806–January 1808) sent over 3,000 Bosnia Eyalet troops under Mehmed Bey Kulenović over the Drina on 25 June 1806, which were destroyed by priest Luka Lazarević, in the Battle of Mišar that culminated on 13 August 1806, and ended in a decisive Serbian victory. Among the Ottoman fallen in the battle, several were notable Bosnian nobility, including Kulenović, Mehmed Vidajić and his two sons, Sinan Sijerčić, and others. Among the prisoners-of-war were kethüda Ibrahim Pasha, Suleyman Pasha Skopljak, Ali Bey Vidajić, Hasan Pasha of Srebrenica and Hasan Pasha of Banja Luka, but they were quickly exchanged. Ibrahim Pasha of Maglaj, Hasan Pasha of Srebrenica, and Ali Bey Vidajić lost two cannons, all ammunition, six war-flags, many horses, and all their personal baggage.

Following Mišar, Ali Bey was among the commanders that stayed in Šabac with their troops and sought to negotiate with the Serbs. After the takeover of Belgrade (December–January), it was eventually agreed that Šabac be handed over to the Serbs, while a Janissary-agha with entourage stay in the fortress, and the Šabac Muslim population be transferred to Bosnia; Šabac was handed over on 7 February [O.S. 26 January] 1807.

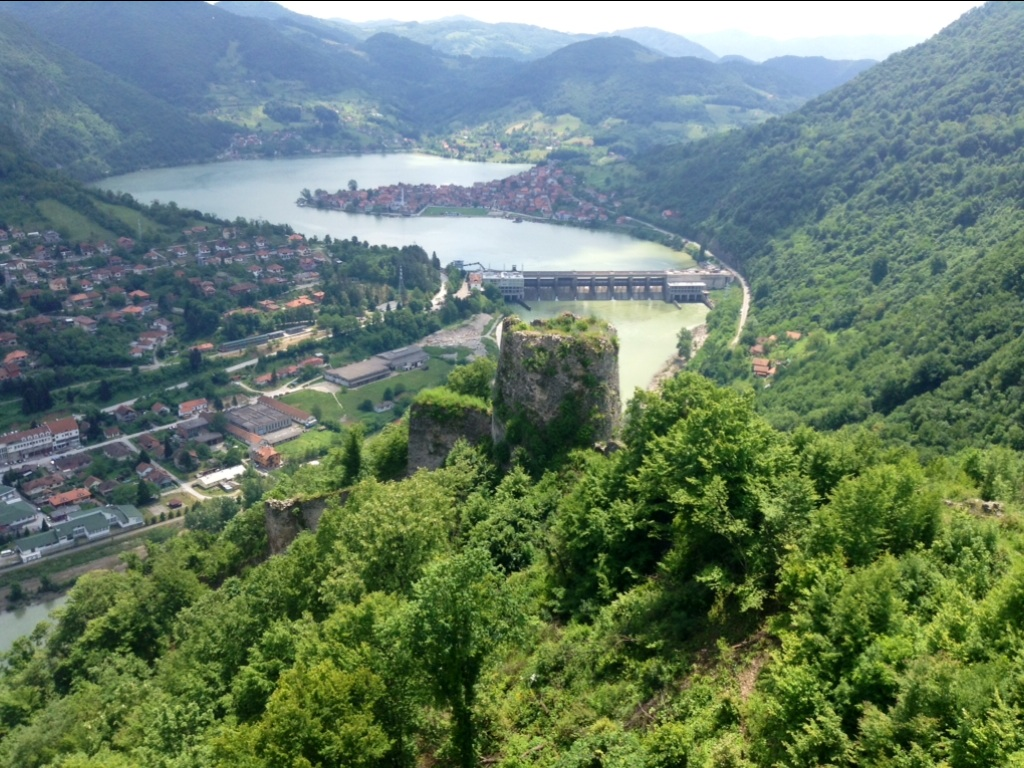
View of the Zvornik Fort and the Drina separating Bosnia and Serbia.

In April 1807, Karađorđe ordered for the expansion of uprising into Bosnia. Serb troops crossing the Drina were also accompanied by local Orthodox, who together attacked the Muslim village of Janj and surrounded Bijeljina, until Ali-paša Vidajić pushed them back across the Drina. As a punishment, Ali-paša Vidajić's troops burnt down the Tavna Monastery and four Orthodox villages along the Drina in April 1807. Zvornik was a key point in Bosnia, with its potential fall being a threat to Sarajevo and Travnik. Ottoman Bosnian troops halted a Serb breakthrough by Zvornik at the end of May 1807 but another Serb unit passed just south of Zvornik towards Vlasenica. In early June 1807 Vizier Mehmed Pasha sent Ali-paša Vidajić with a large contingent from Zvornik into Serbia. On 10 July 1807 a Bosnian-Serbian truce was agreed. Despite the truce, Ali-paša Vidajić with 1,000 troops crossed into Serbia and burnt down and looted several villages. A Serb unit by the Drina was destroyed by a large Ottoman Bosnian force in October 1807 and thus the Serb forces resumed action in Podrinje, burnt down Muslim villages, killed and captured many, and retreated with 1,200 families.

On 5 November 1807 a new attack on Serbia was ordered, while Serb troops went towards Sarajevo. At the beginning of 1808 Serb troops aimed to attack in the directions of Nova Varoš, Višegrad and Bijeljina, and entered Bosnia several times by March 1808, their main objectives being Višegrad and Zvornik. In mid-March "all Bosnian Turks (Muslims) able of carrying weapons" were called to mobilization, with the Ottoman Bosnian captains being ordered to ready a force of 37,000 troops. At the end of April around 1,000 Bosnian troops crossed Zvornik into Soko. Serb rebel actions in Bosnian Podrinje were continued in April 1808, in Srebrenica, and attacks since October 1808 aimed at liberating Semberija.

More serious armed conflicts in eastern Bosnia began in May 1809, with Jakov Nenadović standing at the Drina with 8,000 troops, and the Ottoman Bosnian troops numbering 17–18,000 around Zvornik. Karađorđe conquered Sjenica and attacked Novi Pazar, cutting off the Bosnian communication. The physical division of Ottoman Bosnia from the rest of the Ottoman Empire put fear in Bosnian Muslims and led to their radicalization towards Bosnian Christians, there being toleration among the rayah up until now. Sima Marković, Jakov Nenadović and Luka Lazarević attacked central and south Bosnian Podrinje, while Ali-paša Vidajić organized for the defence of Bijeljina and a large part of Semberija Serbs joined the Serb troops. Meanwhile, the Serb rebels were defeated at Čegar on 31 May 1809 and then lost the front line at the Great Morava. In June 1809 Ottoman Bosnian counter-offensives secured Srebrenica and Bijeljina and pushed the Serbs from Višegrad, thereby returning the Bosnian communication. Many Bosnian Serbs were killed or fled due to the battles in spring 1809 in Podrinje, with Karađorđe settling refugees in Mačva. In July 1809 Ali-paša Vidajić and Ibrahim-paša Srebrenički burnt down Lešnica on the Drina.

The new Vizier of Bosnia, Ibrahim Hilmi Pasha, was ordered by the sultan to destroy Serbia in cooperation with the Rumelian Vizier Hurshid Pasha.

Vidajić participated at the Battle of Loznica (17–18 October 1810), fighting the troops of Anta Bogićević, Luka Lazarević and Jakov Nenadović.

== Bosnian Uprising ==
Fidahić, alongside Husein-kapetan Gradaščević, Ibrahim-beg Firdus, Mujaga Zlatarević and other Bosniak nobles led an uprising against the Ottoman Empire from 1831 to 1832. Fidahić was known as a capable military commander, he commanded a part of the Bosniak rebel army in Kosovo defeating the Ottoman forces in the town of Peć.

During the downfall of the Bosnian Uprising, Fidahić commanded an army of 6,000 men towards Rogatica to prevent the Ottoman Grand Vizier of reaching Sarajevo. Another ally of the Uprising, Hasan-beg Sijerić commanded his army to go from Višegrad towards Pale, making the Glasinac Plateau the main stronghold of the rebel army. The Bosniak rebels managed to defeat the Grand Viziers army but they were ambushed from Trnovo by Smail-aga Čengić and Ali-aga Rizvanbegović, leading to the Battle of Stup and withdrawal of rebel leaders to Slavonia.

== Return to Bosnia, death and lineage ==
Fidahić returned to Bosnia around 1835 where he settled north of Zvornik in Bijeljina. Soon yet again leading a rebellion against the Ottomans in Bosnian Posavina in 1836. He was again exiled in 1840 either to Trabzon or Cyprus where he died in 1845. Fidahić had six sons, the names of three are known and they are Jusuf-beg, Mehmedali-beg and Ibrahim-beg. The Pašić Bosniak family in Bijeljina are descendants of Ali-paša, they took their surnames from his title paša.

== Legacy ==
Ali-paša Vidajić is known also from Serbian epic poetry.

== Annotations ==
1. He was mostly known in Serbo-Croatian historiography as Ali-paša Vidajić (Serbian: Али-паша Видајић) and Ali-beg Vidajić (Serbian: Али-бег Видајић), and also by the demonym Zvornički ("of Zvornik", Али-паша зворнички). He received the rank of pasha later in his life, in 1829. His surname was also spellt Fidahić and Vidaić (Видаић).

== Sources ==
- Antonić, Zdravko (1995). Srpski pisci i naučnici o Bosni i Hercegovini. Službeni list SRJ. ISBN 978-86-355-0251-9.
- Karadžić, Vuk Stefanović (1898). Српски рјечник истумачен њемачкијем и латинскијем ријечима. У штампарији Краљевине Србије.
- Milićević, Milić J. (2016). "Битка код Чокешине". Гласник. 50. Историјски архив Ваљево: 11–24. ISSN 0354-9143.
- Nenadović, Konstantin N. (1903) [1883]. Живот и дела великог Ђорђа Петровића Кара-Ђорђа. Vol. I (2 ed.). Belgrade: Штампа Савића и Комп. (Public Domain)
- Nenadović, Konstantin N. (1884). Живот и дела великог Ђорђа Петровића Кара-Ђорђа. Vol. II (1 ed.). Vienna: У Штампарији Јована Н. Вернаја – via Google Books. (Public Domain)
- Novaković, Stojan (1887). Пронијари и баштиници: (спахије и читлук-сахибије): прилог к историји непокретне имовине у Србији XIII-XIX века. u kralj.-srpskoj državnoj štampariji.
- Pelagić, Vasa (1879). Istorija Bosansko-Ercegovačke bune u svezi sa srpsko- i rusko-turskim ratom: študija za narod i drẑavnike. Štamparija Viktora Hornjanskoga.
- Protić, Kosta (1893). "Ратни догађаји из Првога српског устанка 1804-1813 под вождом Карађорђем Петровићем". Godišnjica Nikole Čupića. XIII: 77–269.
- Ranke, Leopold von (1892). Србија и Турска у деветнаестом веку. Parna štamparija Dim. Dimitrijevića.
- Stojančević, Vladimir (2004). Србија и српски народ у време првог устанка. Матица српска. ISBN 978-86-83651-41-2.
- Stojančević, Vladimir (1971). Južnoslovenski narodi u Osmanskom carstvu od Jedrenskog mira 1829. do Pariskog kongresa 1856. godine. Izdavačko-štamparsko preduzeće PTT.
- Teinović, Bratislav (2020). "Преглед српско-турског ратовања на Дрини (1804-1815)" (PDF). Војноисторијски гласник. 2. Институт за стратегијска истраживања: 9–35.
- Živković, Mita (1894). Сарајево од свог постанка до данас. Kostić.
