= Cikote (Loznica) =

Cikote Цикоте (Serbian)
- Village (Selo)
- Location within Serbia
- Coordinates: 44°29′N 19°24′E
- Country: Serbia
- District: Mačva District
- Municipality: Loznica

Population (2002)
  - Total: 1,173
- Time zone: UTC+1 (CET)
  - Summer (DST): UTC+2 (CEST)

Cikote (Serbian: Цикоте) is a village in the municipality of Loznica, Serbia. According to the 2002 census, the village has a population of 1173 people.

During the late Ottoman period, Cikote was a village part of the Jadar knežina (Serb self-governing village group), in the Sanjak of Zvornik. The village was a site of operations during the First Serbian Uprising. Sima Sarić from the village participated in operations in Podrinje under the command of Đorđe Ćurčija in 1804.

== Notable people ==
- Sima Sarić (Serbian: Сима Сарић) or Simo (Симо Сарић), hajduk harambaša (brigand, guerilla leader) active in the First Serbian Uprising. Joined hajduk leader Đorđe Ćurčija who crossed into Jadar on 15 July 1804 and dispersed Turks from the area. Rallied the people of Jadar in 1804, together with hajduk Todor Bojinović, Gavrilo Caklen, and monk Đunisije of the Tronoša monastery, in opposition to Anta Bogićević's truce with Ali-paša Vidajić of Zvornik. Sarić was sent by Ćurčija to take over Loznica, and he entered an empty town, the Turks having left for Bosnia. He appointed the local command in Loznica and then dug trenches towards the Drina to defend from incoming Ottoman Bosnian troops. After vojvoda Jakov Nenadović's arrival, the Jadar men chose Anta to lead them and Anta was elevated to vojvoda and appointed several buljubaša (captain), among whom were Sarić.

== Sources ==
- Ilić, Mikica (15 February 2017). "Đorđe Obradović – Ćurčija, Karađorđev ustanik iz Bosuta". M novine (791). Sremska Mitrovica: 35–41 – via Academia.edu.
- Obradović, Stojan (1873). Живот и радња заслужних Срба из окружија шабачког и подринског у књажеству Србији у устанцима противу насиља турског од 1804. и 1815. године: у два одељка. Stefanović.
- Tomić, Persida, ed. (1964). "Јадар". Гласник Етнографског музеја у Београду. 27. Etnografski muzej u Beogradu.
