= Deli Hasan Pasha (Srebrenica) =

Ottoman Bosnian commander

- Born: Hasan; Srebrenica, Sanjak of Zvornik, Bosnia Eyalet
- Died: October 1810; Loznica, Revolutionary Serbia
- Cause of death: (KIA)
- Relatives: Hadji Sali Bey (cousin)
- Military career
- Allegiance: Ottoman Empire
- Branch: Sipahi (cavalry)
- Service years: 1797–1810
- Rank: mutesarrif, pasha
- Units: Deli; Bosnia Eyalet; Sanjak of Zvornik
- Commands: Sanjak of Zvornik (1797–1810)
- Conflicts: First Serbian Uprising

Deli Hasan Pasha (fl. 1797–d. 1810), known as Srebrenica, was the mutesarrif ("plenipotentiary") of the Sanjak of Zvornik from 1797 to 1805. He actively fought the Serbian rebels in the First Serbian Uprising (1804–1813), and was appointed a campaign general in 1805. His cousin Hadji Sali Bey (d. 1822) was an ayan in Srebrenica that accompanied the Ottoman Bosnian army against the Serbian rebels. Hasan Pasha fell at the Battle of Mišar.

== Life ==
Hasan Pasha was from Srebrenica. He was the mutesarrif ("plenipotentiary") of the Sanjak of Zvornik from 1797 to 1805. His cousin Hadji Sali Bey (d. 1822) was an ayan in Srebrenica, with the rank of Imperial kapıcıbaşı.

Hasan Pasha actively fought the Serbian rebels in the First Serbian Uprising (1804–1813).

The new Vizier of Bosnia, Mustafa Pasha Ismailpašić (t. January 1805–March 1806), ordered for the mobilization of all of the Ottoman Bosnian army at Podrinje. Ismailpašić appointed Hasan Pasha, the mutesarrif of Zvornik, as the general of the campaign, with deputies Hadji Sali Bey of Srebrenica, Sinan Pasha Sijerčić of Goražde, Mehmed Agha of Višegrad, and Sarajevo Janissary başağa Memiš-aga Mačković. They were subsequently accompanied by Hasan Pasha of Banja Luka, Bayraktar Ali from Prusce, the mutesarrif of Klis Suleyman Pasha, Ibrahim Agha from Kobaš, and Mahmud Agha from Jezero. The Porte issued a ferman (decree) to the Bosnian Vizier that called for the Bosnian Muslim to attack via the Drina in three directions, Užice, Šabac, Kara-Nevča, with all their might. Mustafa Pasha issued a buyruldu (decree) on 24 November 1805 that informed Bosnian officials of the order to finally suppress the Serbian rebels.

The first organized Ottoman Bosnian attack came in late January 1806 when two detachments crossed the Drina, one via Lešnica towards Šabac, and the other via Srebrenica and Soko towards Valjevo. Kara-Marko and Milan Obrenović defeated Hasan Pasha in February 1806 and rebel leader Karađorđe's troops burnt down several towns and villages in the Podrinje area by March 1806. While Stojan Čupić and Janko Katić destroyed kaptan Mehmed Bey Vidajić in Zvornik, the Bosnian Eyalet troops quickly consolidated and stopped rebel expansion in Bosnian Podrinje. In the summer of 1806, Karađorđe's envoy Matija Stefanović negotiated peace on the Drina with Bosnian leaders at Travnik but this failed due to a Serb attack on Belgrade.

The new Vizier of Bosnia, Koca Hüsrev Mehmed Pasha (t. April 1806–January 1808) sent over 3,000 Bosnia Eyalet troops under Mehmed Bey Kulenović (Kulin-kapetan) over the Drina on 25 June 1806, which were destroyed by priest Luka Lazarević, in the Battle of Mišar that culminated on 13 August 1806, and ended in a decisive Serbian victory. Among the Ottoman fallen in the battle, several were notable Bosnian nobility, including Kulenović, Mehmed Vidajić and his two sons, Sinan Sijerčić, and others. Among the prisoners-of-war were kethüda Ibrahim Pasha, Suleyman Pasha Skopljak, Ali Bey Vidajić, Hasan Pasha of Srebrenica and Hasan Pasha of Banja Luka, but they were quickly exchanged. Ibrahim Pasha of Maglaj, Hasan Pasha of Srebrenica, and Ali Bey Vidajić lost two cannons, all ammunition, six war-flags, many horses, and all their personal baggage. Hasan Pasha allegedly offered 100 bags of gold to be released.

Following Mišar, Hasan Pasha was among the commanders that stayed in Šabac with their troops and sought to negotiate with the Serbs. After the takeover of Belgrade (December–January), it was eventually agreed that Šabac be handed over to the Serbs, while a Janissary-agha with entourage stay in the fortress, and the Šabac Muslim population be transferred to Bosnia; Šabac was handed over on 7 February [O.S. 26 January] 1807.

In 1808, during campaigns in Podrinje, Serbian generals Anta Bogićević, Petar Moler and Krsta Ignjatović destroyed a large army led by Hasan Pasha and Sali Bey in a battle that took three days, during an encirclement of Rožanj.

Hasan Pasha fell at Loznica in October 1810.

== See also ==
- List of people of the First Serbian Uprising

== Annotations ==
1. Deli Hasan Pasha (Bosnian: Deli Hasan-paša), known with the demonym ("of Srebrenica") as Srebrenica (Serbian: Хасан-паша Сребреница), Srebrenički (Хасан-паша сребренички) or Srebrnički (Хасан-паша сребрнички), or "Hasan Pasha from Srebrenica" (Хасан-паша од Сребренице). In Viennese military documents his name is spelt Assan Passa and in French as Hassan-Pacha.

== Sources ==
- Drašković, Radovan M. (1987). Valjevo u prošlosti: prilozi za zavičajnu istoriju. Milić Rakić. ISBN 978-86-7173-008-2. "Хасан - паша сребрнички"
- Janković, Dragoslav (1959). Француска штампа о првом српском устанку. Vol. 10. Naučno Delo.
- Pravni fakultet Sarajevo (1950). Istorisko-pravni zbornik: organ Opšteg seminara za istoriju drzave i prava. Pravni fakultet Sarajevo. p. 258. "Deli Hasan-paša ... Srebrenica"
- Protić, Kosta (1893). "Ратни догађаји из првога српског устанка под Карађорђем Петровићем 1804—1813". Годишњица Николе Чупића. XIII. Državna štamparija.
- Stojančević, Vladimir (2004). Србија и српски народ у време првог устанка. Матица српска. ISBN 978-86-83651-41-2. "Хасан - паша Сребренички"
- Teinović, Bratislav (2020). "Преглед српско-турског ратовања на Дрини (1804-1815)" (PDF). Војноисторијски гласник. 2. Институт за стратегијска истраживања: 9–35.

Military offices
Preceded by ?	mutesarrif of the Sanjak of Zvornik; 1797 – 1805	Succeeded by ?
