= Mehmed Bey Vidajić =

Ottoman Bosnian official (1804–10)

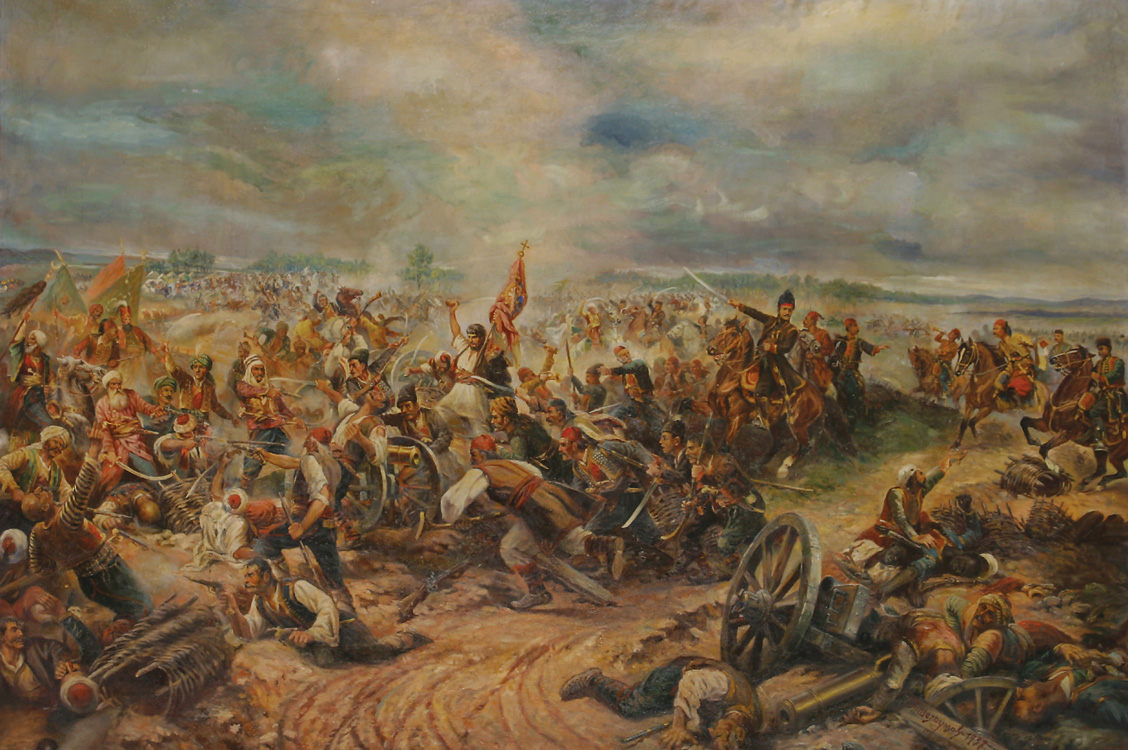
- The Battle of Mišar by Afanasij Scheloumoff
- Born: Unknown; Bosnia Eyalet
- Died: 13–15 August 1806; Mišar, Revolutionary Serbia
- Other name: Mehmed-kapetan
- Relatives: Ali-paša Vidajić (nephew)
- Military career
- Allegiance: Ottoman Empire
- Service years: fl. 1804–06
- Rank: kaptan (captain), bey
- Unit: Zvornik
- Conflicts: First Serbian Uprising

Mehmed Bey Vidajić, known as Mehmed-kapetan (fl. 1803–d. August 1806), was an Ottoman Bosnian official and kaptan (fortress commander, Serbo-Croatian: kapetan) in Zvornik. He had the honorific bey title. He was active during the First Serbian Uprising (1804–13), in which the Serbs of the Sanjak of Smederevo revolted against the Ottoman Empire and made incursions into Bosnia.

== Early life ==
Vidajić had two nephews that were ranked Ottoman captains, one which was the notable Ali-paša Vidajić. He also had a relative called Dervish Aga (fl. 1804), and another contemporary with the surname was Abd-aga Vidajić (fl. 1806), commander of the Šabac Fort. The family was of Islamized Serb origin (and retained their original surname), and belonged to the "captain families" coming from the lower class, spoke Serbo-Croatian and did not speak Turkish. Their slava (patron saint veneration) was Saint George (Đurđevdan). He was a captain in Zvornik, and had several sons who fought alongside him.

== Career ==
The Dahije (that had earlier wrested the Sanjak of Smederevo) were supported by Ali-paša Vidajić against the revolting Serbs that attacked the towns of Valjevo and Šabac in springtime 1804. After defeating the Dahije, Karađorđe sent Anta Bogićević with Jevta Savić Čotrić to conclude a peace treaty with Mehmed-paša Vidajić, which was signed, but short-lived.

The Ottoman sultan ordered the Viziers of Bosnia in 1805 to muster armies to attack Serbia, and they crossed the Drina and attacked Valjevo and Šabac in late January 1806. The Serb rebels managed to stop the incursion in Mačva by Mehmed-paša Vidajić. He clashed with Todor Bojinović around Loznica. In one event, Serbian leader Karađorđe was surrounded and wounded at the Žičko polje near Lešnica fighting Mehmed-kapetan Vidajić in early 1806, and was forced to retreat to Jelenča, where a reinforcement that included Jovan Tomić Belov destroyed an Ottoman unit. Hasan-paša Srebrenički was defeated in February and rebel leader Karađorđe's troops burnt down several towns and villages in the Podrinje area by March 1806. Serb commanders Stojan Čupić and Janko Katić destroyed Mehmed-kapetan Vidajić at Zvornik, but the Ottoman Bosnian troops quickly reassembled and stopped Serb expansion on the Bosnian side of the Drina.

Ottoman troops were decisively defeated at the Battle of Mišar in August 1806 by troops led by priest and rebel leader Luka Lazarević. Among the Ottoman fallen, many were notable Bosnian nobility, among whom were Mahmud-beg Kulenović of Kulen-Vakuf and Mehmed-kapetan Vidajić and his two sons. Ali-paša Vidajić was captured along with four other pashas, all of whom were quickly exchanged.

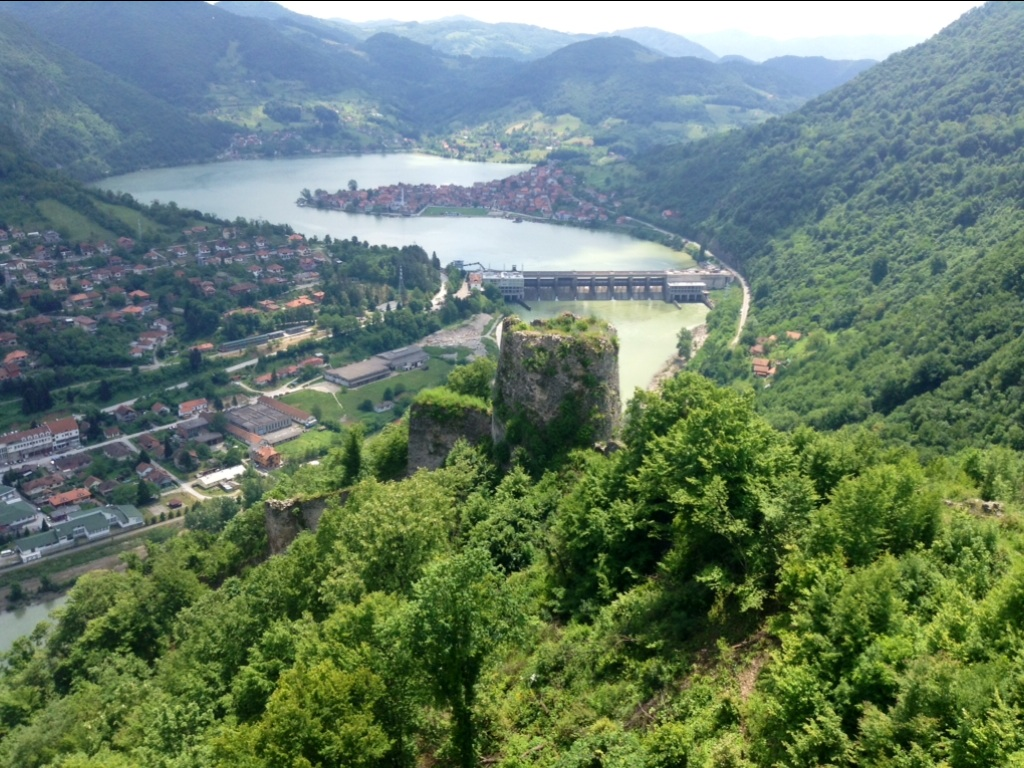
View of the Zvornik Fort and the Drina separating Bosnia and Serbia.

His nephew Ali-paša Vidajić continued to fight the Serbs but eventually fell at Loznica (17–18 October 1810).

== Legacy ==
Mehmed-kapetan Vidajić is known also from Serbian epic poetry.

== Annotations ==
1. Known as Serbo-Croatian: Mehmed-kapetan Vidajić (Serbian: Мехмед-капетан Видајић), scarcely as Mehmed-beg Vidajić (Serbian: Мехмед-бег Видајић). His surname was also spellt "Fidahić" and "Vidaić" (Видаић).

== Sources ==
- Antonić, Zdravko (1995). Srpski pisci i naučnici o Bosni i Hercegovini. Službeni list SRJ. ISBN 978-86-355-0251-9.
- Karadžić, Vuk Stefanović (1898). Српски рјечник истумачен њемачкијем и латинскијем ријечима. У штампарији Краљевине Србије.
- Milićević, Milan Đ. (1888). Поменик знаменитих људи у српског народа новијега доба. Издање Чупићеве задужбине. p. 34 – via Archive.org.
- Nenadović, Konstantin N. (1903) [1883]. Живот и дела великог Ђорђа Петровића Кара-Ђорђа. Vol. I (2 ed.). Belgrade: Штампа Савића и Комп. (Public Domain)
- Nenadović, Konstantin N. (1884). Живот и дела великог Ђорђа Петровића Кара-Ђорђа. Vol. II (1 ed.). Vienna: У Штампарији Јована Н. Вернаја – via Google Books. (Public Domain)
- Pelagić, Vasa (1879). Istorija Bosansko-Ercegovačke bune u svezi sa srpsko- i rusko-turskim ratom: študija za narod i drẑavnike. Štamparija Viktora Hornjanskoga.
- Protić, Kosta (1893). "Ратни догађаји из Првога српског устанка 1804-1813 под вождом Карађорђем Петровићем". Godišnjica Nikole Čupića. XIII: 77–269.
- Ranke, Leopold von (1892). Србија и Турска у деветнаестом веку. Parna štamparija Dim. Dimitrijevića.
- Teinović, Bratislav (2020). "Преглед српско-турског ратовања на Дрини (1804-1815)". Vojnoistorijski glasnik. 2: 9–35.
- Živković, Mita (1894). Сарајево од свог постанка до данас. Kostić.
