= Jarebice =

Jarebice may refer to:

- Jarebice (Loznica), a village in Serbia
- Jarebice (Tutin), a village in Serbia
