= Bojinović =

Bojinović (Serbian: Бојиновић) is a Serbian patronymic surname, derived from Bojin.

- Todor Bojinović (d. 1813), Serbian revolutionary
- Mladen Bojinović (born 1977), Serbian handball player
