= Milan Jugović =

Serbian politician

Milan Jugović (Serbian Cyrillic: Немања Поповић; born 1985) is a politician in Serbia. He has served in the National Assembly of Serbia since October 2020 as a member of the Serbian Progressive Party.

== Private career ==
Jugović has a master's degree in history. He lives in the village of Klupci in Loznica.

== Politician ==
=== Municipal politics ===
Jugović received the fourth position on the Progressive Party's electoral list for the Loznica municipal assembly in the 2016 Serbian local elections and was elected when the list won a majority victory with thirty-four mandates. He led the Progressive group in the assembly for the next four years. He was not a candidate for re-election at the local level in 2020.

=== Parliamentarian ===
Jugović was awarded the 192nd position on the Progressive Party's Aleksandar Vučić — For Our Children list for the 2020 Serbian parliamentary election and narrowly missed direct election when the list won a landslide majority with 188 of 250 mandates. He is the leader of Serbia's parliamentary friendship group with Guinea-Bissau and a member of the parliamentary friendship groups with Belarus, Bosnia and Herzegovina, and Russia.
