= Miokovci =

- Village
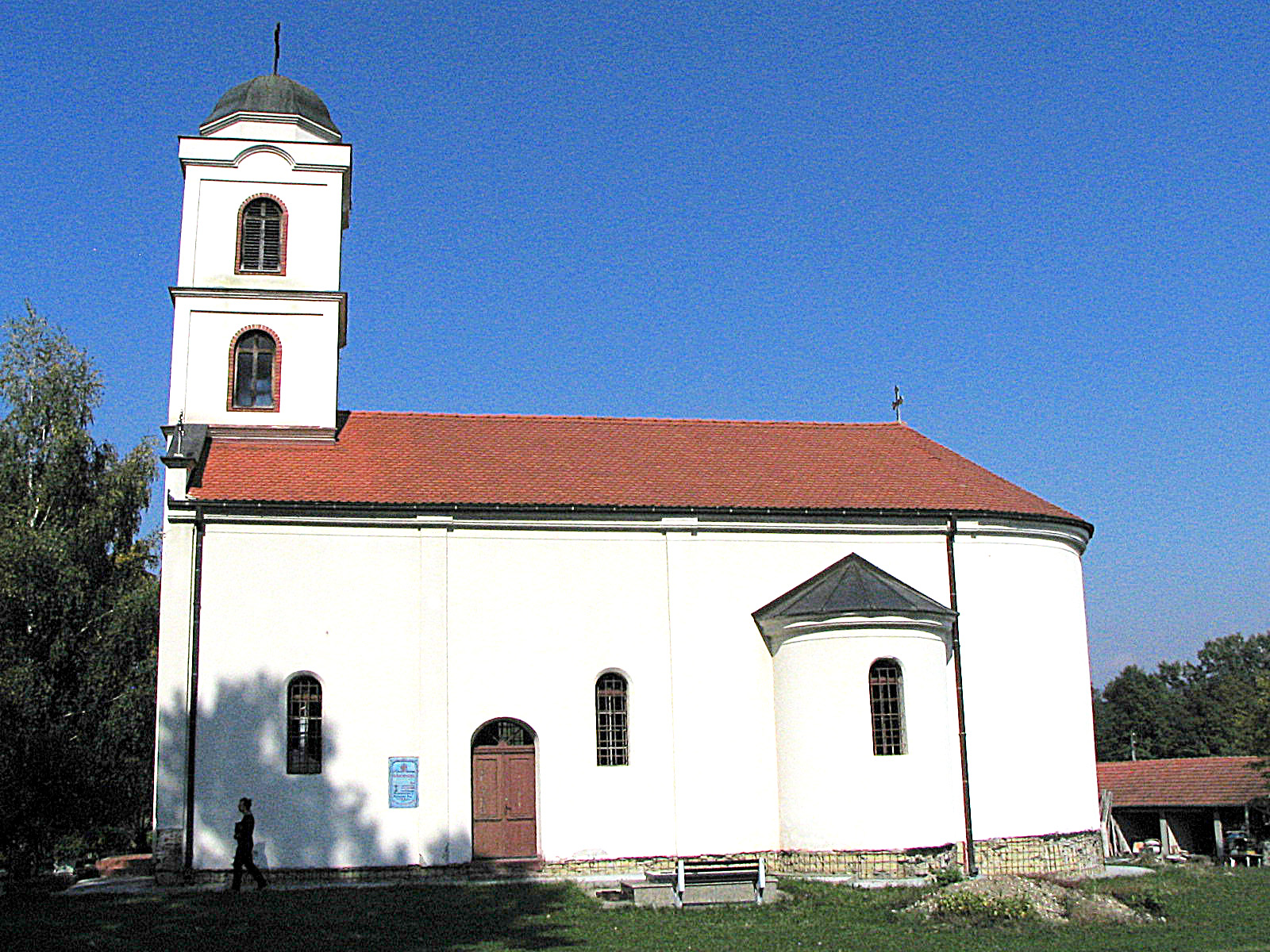
- Church house of Miokovci

- Location within Serbia
- Coordinates: 43°57′00″N 20°15′24″E
- Country: Serbia
- District: Moravica District
- Municipality: Čačak

Area
  - Total: 21.34 km^{2} (8.24 sq mi)
- Elevation: 347 m (1,138 ft)

Population (2011)
  - Total: 969
  - Density: 45.4/km^{2} (118/sq mi)
- Time zone: UTC+1 (CET)
  - Summer (DST): UTC+2 (CEST)

Miokovci (Serbian Cyrillic: Миоковци) is a village in the municipality of Čačak, Serbia. According to the 2011 census, the village has a population of 969 people.

The village is the birth place of Periša Savić (fl. 1807–d. 1817), Serbian rebel buljubaša and knez of Karadak knežina (1816–17) under Miloš Obrenović.
