= Toša Đorđević =

Serbian voivode

Toša Đorđević (c. 1790–1850) was a Serbian revolutionary, known for his bravery in the First Serbian Uprising. He was a buljubaša and the right-hand-man of Hajduk Veljko during the liberation of the Gurgusovac (modern Knjaževac) region. After the liberation of the area, Toša was promoted to the rank of vojvoda of Gurgusovac. Years later, Toša fell in disfavour when Miloš Obrenović's government removed him as the captain of Zaglavlje after the suppression of a rebellion in the Bulgarian town of Belogradchik in 1836. Miloš did this as a diplomatic move to appease the Porte and remove all existing rumours of troubles brewing at the borders of Serbia and Bulgaria. He died in 1850 in Knjaževac.
