= Todor Bojinović =

Serbian commander

- Born: Todor Bojinović; 1750s Gornji Dobrić, Sanjak of Smederevo
- Died: After 7 October 1813; Zvornik, Sanjak of Zvornik
- Cause of death: Hanging
- Other name: Teodor Boinović
- Military career
- Allegiance: Habsburg Monarchy (1788–91); Revolutionary Serbia (1804–13)
- Service years: 1788–91, 1804–09, 1813
- Rank: buljubaša
- Units: Drina, Jadar
- Commands: Podrinje
- Conflicts: Austro-Turkish War (1788–1791); First Serbian Uprising (1804–13)

Todor Bojinović (Serbian: Тодор Бојиновић; 1750s–1813) was a Serbian revolutionary commander active in the First Serbian Uprising (1804–1813) and a Serbian Free Corps veteran in the Austro-Turkish War (1788–1791).

Bojinović was born in Gornji Dobrić in the Jadar region in the 1750s. During the Austro-Turkish War (1788–1791) he was a buljubaša (captain) of a volunteer unit of the Serbian Free Corps that defended the Drina river. When the Austrian army retreated and peace was signed, he continued fighting for a while as a hajduk. After the war he lived peacefully as a peasant in his village.

In 1804, following the outbreak of uprising, he was appointed a buljubaša on the right side of the Jadar by hajduk leader Đorđe Ćurčija. Ćurčija sent him to Lešnica to push out the Ottoman Bosnian troops there, and he made a base at the Ranitovača forest. After the murder of Ćurčija in the summer of 1804, Bojinović became the top commander in the Jadar. The Ottoman sultan ordered the Viziers of the Bosnia Eyalet in 1805 to muster armies to attack Serbia, and they crossed the Drina and attacked Valjevo and Šabac in late January 1806. The Serb rebels managed to stop the incursion in Mačva by Mehmed-kapetan Vidajić. Bojinović led battles against Mehmed-kapetan Vidajić around Loznica. While capturing a "Turk" soldier alive, he was shot and wounded in the hip. He stayed at the Radovašnica Monastery to recuperate, but did not extract the bullet.

In 1807, leader Jakov Nenadović rallied Jadar and Rađevina and appointed Anta Bogićević the vojvoda of Jadar, and also appointed several buljubaša. Bojinović was not given any command (which Jakov Nenadović later regretted) but gathered a band and went by his own will above Lešnica to defend the frontier. In 1808 Bojinović was talked into by his band to demand from Anta Bogićević to be appointed buljubaša of the right side of Jadar, still subordinated to Anta Bogićević, and he left with his friend Gavrilo Caklen for Belgrade. In autumn at Belgrade, the Governing Council viewed this as a public-order crime and sought to imprison them, but they managed to flee to the Šabac nahija. Caklen was killed in action across the Drina the following year. In 1809, Bojinović was over 50 years old, and he spent the next four years with his family (wife and children) in Gornji Dobrić.

When the Ottomans suppressed the uprising and retook the Sanjak of Smederevo, Bojinović once again set out for Jadar, but was captured and taken to Zvornik and hanged.

Bojinović was described as a big man, with long cheeks and wide cheekbones, big hooked nose, large and thick mustache, having a very heroic look. He was brave and also had administrative capabilities, holding discipline in his unit based on his Austrian training.

== See also ==
- List of Serbian Revolutionaries
- Timeline of the Serbian Revolution

== Annotations ==
1. His name is spelt Todor Bojinović (Тодор Бојиновић) and Teodor Boinović (Теодор Боиновић).

== Sources ==
- Ilić, Mikica (15 February 2017). "Đorđe Obradović – Ćurčija, Karađorđev ustanik iz Bosuta". M novine (791). Sremska Mitrovica: 35–41 – via Academia.edu.
- Milićević, Milan Đ. (1888). Поменик знаменитих људи у српског народа новијега доба. Издање Чупићеве задужбине. pp. 41–42 – via Archive.org.
- Nenadović, Konstantin N. (1884). Живот и дела великог Ђорђа Петровића Кара-Ђорђа. Vol. II (1 ed.). Vienna: У Штампарији Јована Н. Вернаја – via Google Books.
- Obradović, Stojan (1873). Живот и радња заслужних Срба из окружија шабачког и подринског у књажеству Србији у устанцима противу насиља турског од 1804. и 1815. године: у два одељка. Stefanović.
- Teinović, Bratislav (2020). "Преглед српско-турског ратовања на Дрини (1804-1815)". Vojnoistorijski glasnik. 2: 9–35.
