= Šurice (Loznica) =

Coordinates: 44°29′33″N 19°23′41″E

Šurice Шурице (Serbian)
- Village (Selo)
- Interactive map of Šurice
- Country: Serbia
- District: Mačva District
- Municipality: Loznica

Population (2002)
  - Total: 281
- Time zone: UTC+1 (CET)
  - Summer (DST): UTC+2 (CEST)

Šurice is a village in the municipality of Loznica, Serbia. According to the 2002 census, the village has a population of 281 people.
