= Jadranska Lešnica =

Jadranska Lešnica Јадранска Лешница (Serbian)
- Village (Selo)
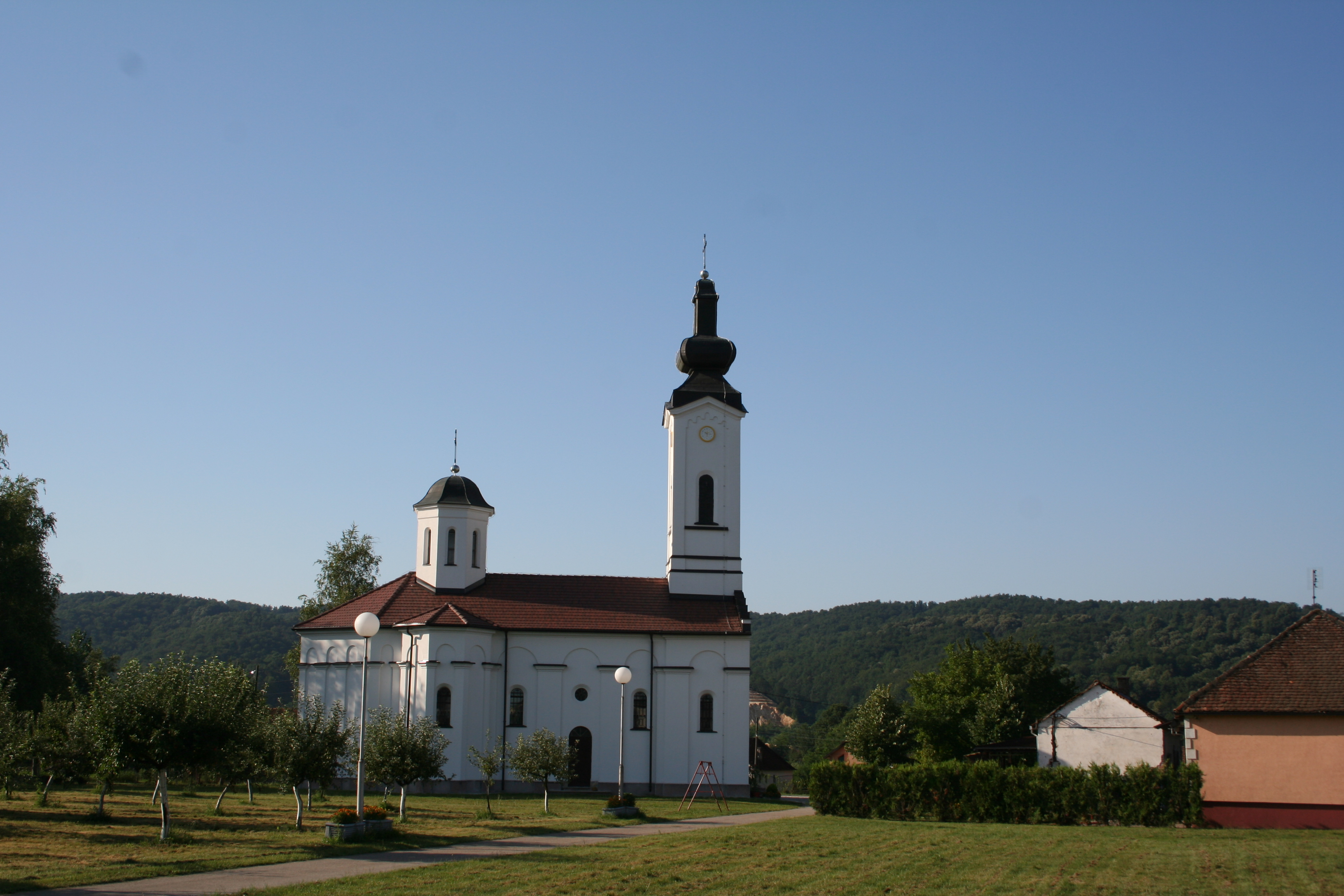

- Location within Serbia
- Coordinates: 44°35′57″N 19°21′13″E
- Country: Serbia
- District: Mačva District
- Municipality: Loznica
- Elevation: 551 ft (168 m)

Population (2002)
  - Total: 2,088
- Time zone: UTC+1 (CET)
  - Summer (DST): UTC+2 (CEST)

Jadranska Lešnica (Serbian: Јадранска Лешница) or Jadarska Lešnica (Јадарска Лешница) is a village in the municipality of Loznica, Serbia. According to the 2002 census, the village has a population of 2088 people.

It was also formerly known as Begova Lešnica.

== Notable people ==
- Gavrilo Caklen (Гаврило Цаклен), known as Gaja (Гаја Цаклен), Serbian rebel in Jadar, brother-in-arms of Todor Bojinović. Rallied the people of Jadar in 1804, together with Todor Bojinović, Sima Sarić and monk Đunisije of the Tronoša monastery, in opposition to Anta Bogićević's truce with Ali-paša Vidajić of Zvornik. When the Jadar men chose Anta to lead them and he was elevated to vojvoda (general), Anta appointed several buljubaša (captain), among whom were Todor Bojinović, Sima Sarić, Gaja Caklen, Trivun, Tešan, and Marko Gvozdenović.

== Sources ==
- Milićević, Milan Đ. (1888). Поменик знаменитих људи у српског народа новијега доба. Издање Чупићеве задужбине. pp. 41–42 – via Archive.org.
- Obradović, Stojan (1873). Живот и радња заслужних Срба из окружија шабачког и подринског у књажеству Србији у устанцима противу насиља турског од 1804. и 1815. године: у два одељка. Stefanović.
- Tomić, Persida, ed. (1964). "Јадар". Гласник Етнографског музеја у Београду. 27. Etnografski muzej u Beogradu.
