= Posavina rebellion (1836) =

The Posavina rebellion broke out in the region of Bosnian Posavina, then part of the Ottoman Empire. It was led by Ottoman Bosnian nobility.

== Sources ==
- Rifat Mulabegović (1997). Bosanska Posavina-dio cjelovite Bosne i Hercegovine: zbornik radova sa Okruglog Stola održanog 24. 11. 1994. godine u Sarajevu. Sabor Bosanske Posavine.
