= Theodore's Saturday =

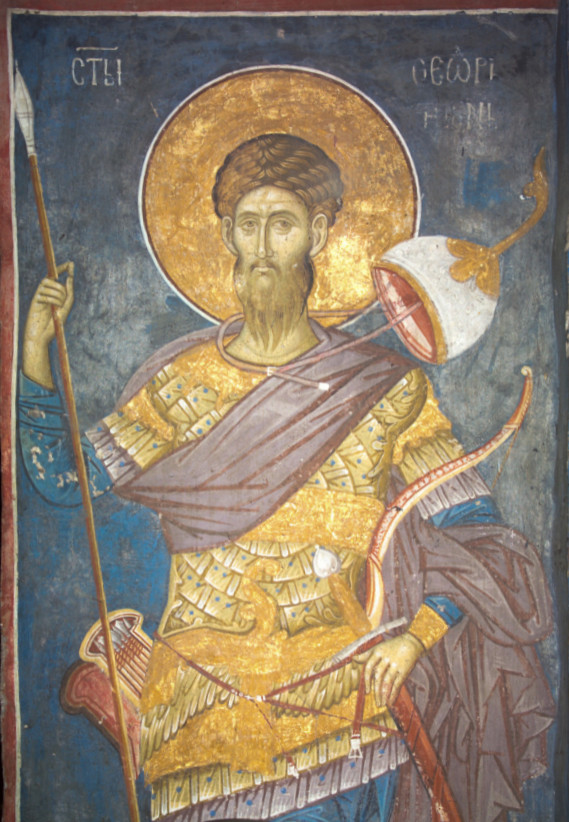
- Fresco of Theodore from Visoki Dečani
- Observed by: Eastern Orthodox
- Type: Christian
- Date: first Saturday of Great Lent
- Frequency: Annual
- Started by: Patriarch Nektarios of Constantinople (t. 381–397)
- Related to: Great Lent

The Saturday of the First Week of Great Lent or Theodore's Saturday is an Eastern Orthodox feast day celebrated on the first Saturday of the Great Lent (40 days of fasting). St. Theodore the Recruit has been honored annually on this day since the mid-5th century, first established by Patriarch Nektarios of Constantinople (t. 381–397). St. Theodore was a martyr, a soldier in the Roman army killed after confessing Christianity. The feast day is a celebration of a miracle, when fifty years after his death the Emperor Julian the Apostate (r. 361–363) ordered for the polemarch of Constantinople to sprinkle sacrificial animal blood on the food in the marketplace during the Clean Week (the first week of fasting), and St. Theodore appeared in a dream of Archbishop Eudoxios (t. 360–370) and told him to have the Christians not eat from the market but instead only eat kollyva (wheat) with honey that week. Julian's defilement attempt was thus thwarted.

The feast day involves preparing kollyva which is brought to the church and placed in front of Christ's icon, with candles inserted into the kollyva. Special hymns are included at the end of the Liturgy, and after the service, the kollyva is distributed among the faithful and the family and friends then visit the graves of their beloved. If a priest is present, he conducts a Trisagion hymn and pours kollyva on the grave.

== Annotations ==
1. Serbian: Теодорова субота/Teodorova subota, Macedonian: Тодорова сабота/Todorova sabota
