= Šabac Fortress =

Fortress next to Šabac

Šabačka tvrđava; Zaslon Шабачка тврђава; Заслон Böğürdelen
- Šabac; Serbia
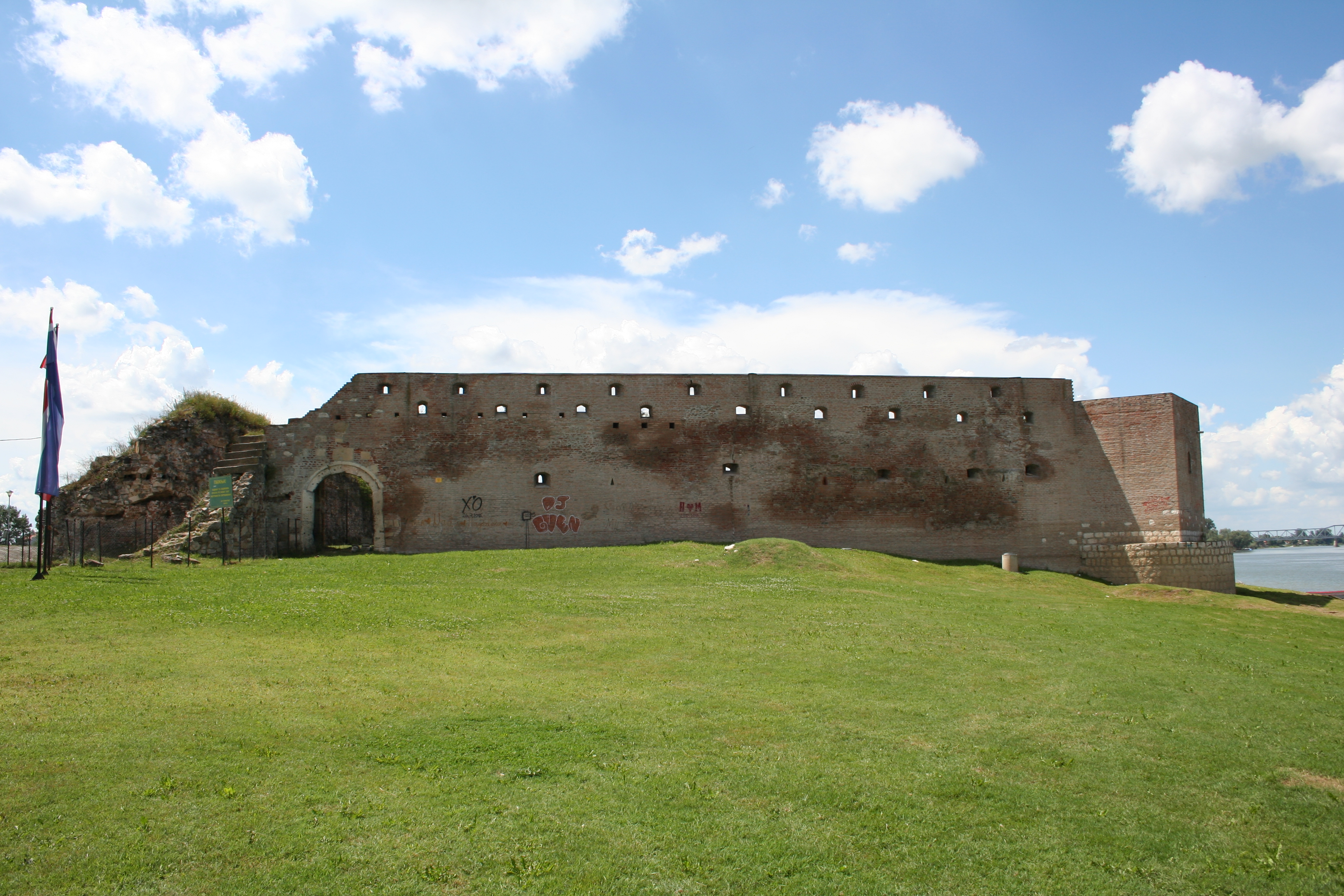
- Remains of the fortress

Site information
- Type: Strategic fortification
- Open to the public: Yes
- Condition: Remains

Location
- Coordinates: 44.7642°N 19.7036°E

Site history
- Built: 1471
- Built by: Isa-Beg Ishaković
- Materials: Stone

Šabac fortress (Serbian: Шабачка тврђава, romanized: Šabačka tvrđava; Turkish: Böğürdelen Kalesi), is a fortress next to modern day Šabac, on the right riverbank of Sava.

== History ==
Originally the location where the fortress was built was a trading square of the settlement known as Zaslon, where the merchants from Ragusa would trade their goods.

The fortress was built in 1471 by Isa-Beg Ishaković, but soon afterwards, in 1476, it was captured by the Hungarian army with the help of the Serbian despot Vuk Grgurević and Vlad The Impaler, who kept the Šabac fortress under his control for more than four decades. In 1521, on his campaign on the way to Belgrade, Suleiman the Magnificent captured Šabac. As soon as he got hold of it, he had the earth palisade fortifications replaced with bulwark constructions with towers. In the period from 1717 until 1739, during temporary Austrian occupation, the fortress underwent significant adaptations and its surface was extended with additional construction of outer fortifications.

== Gallery ==
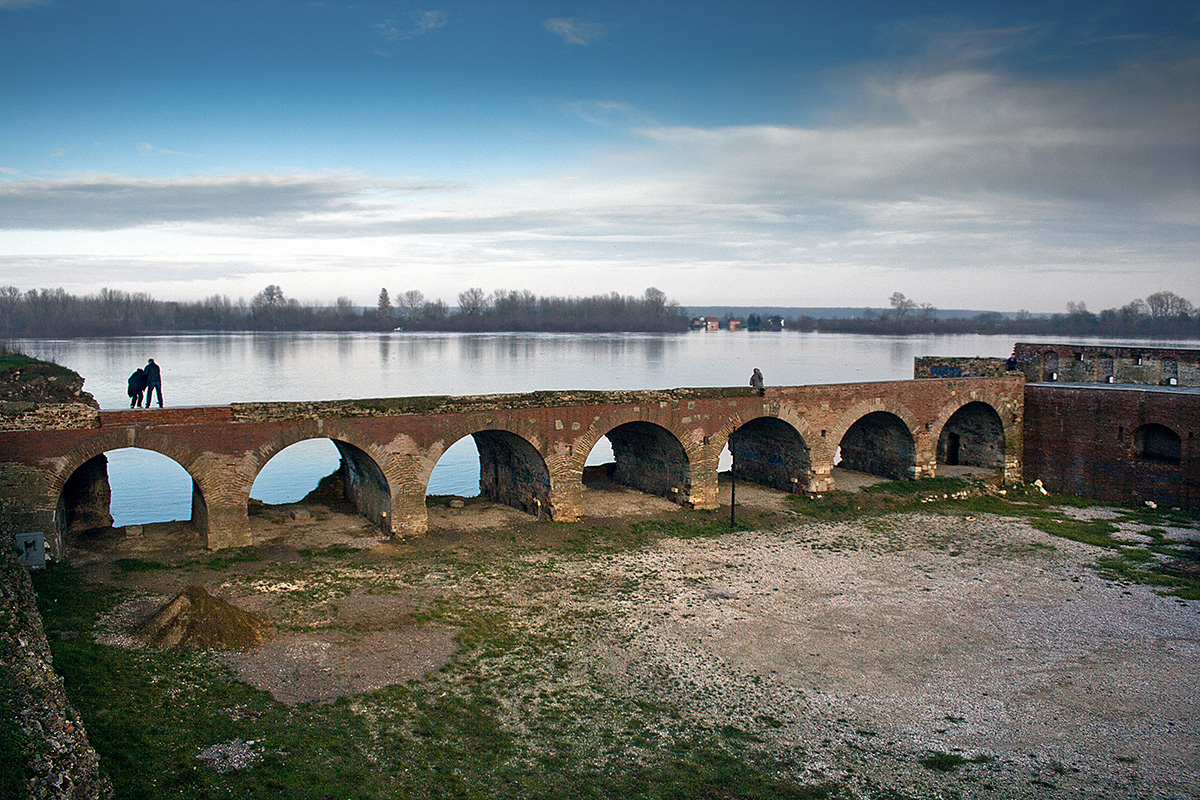

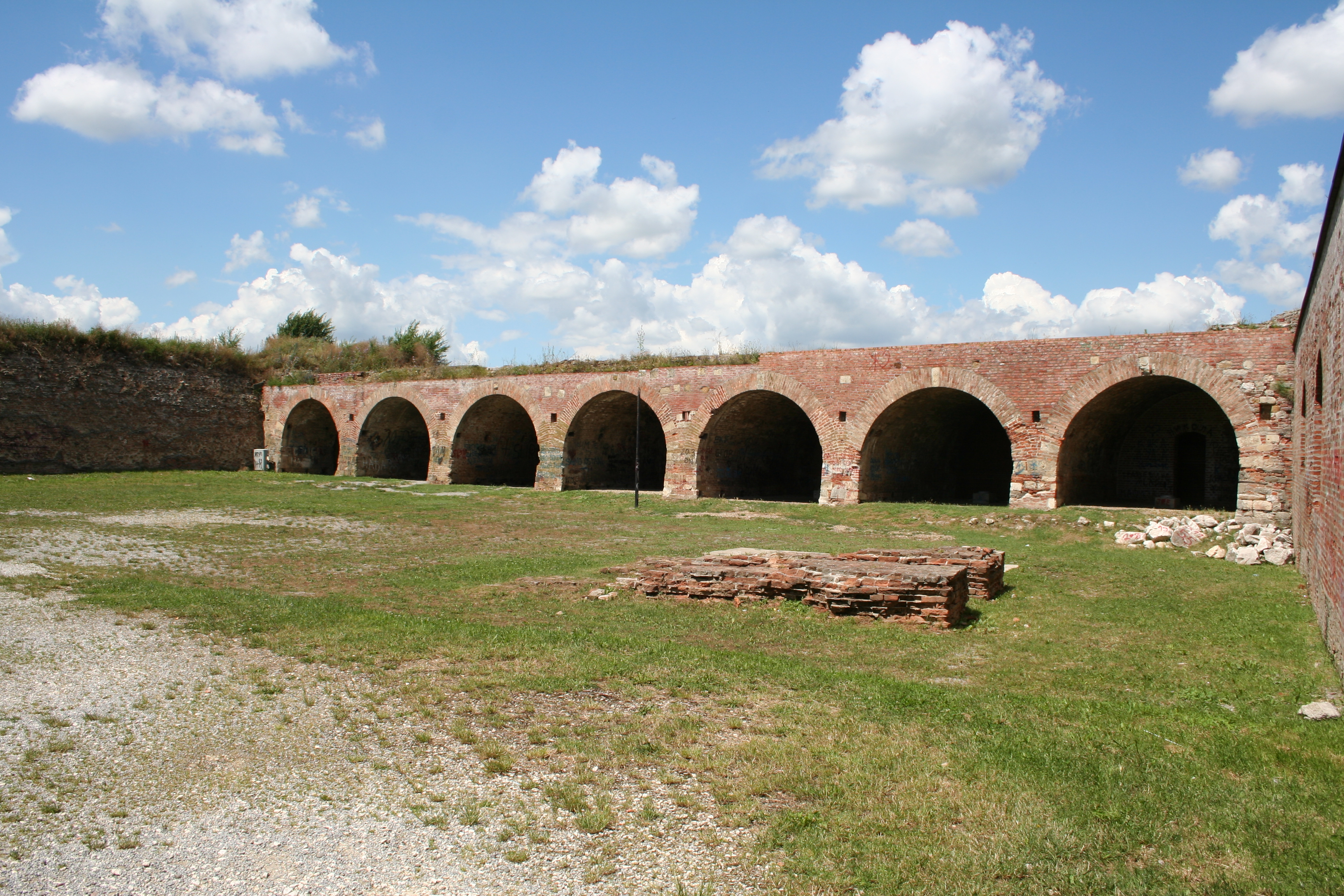

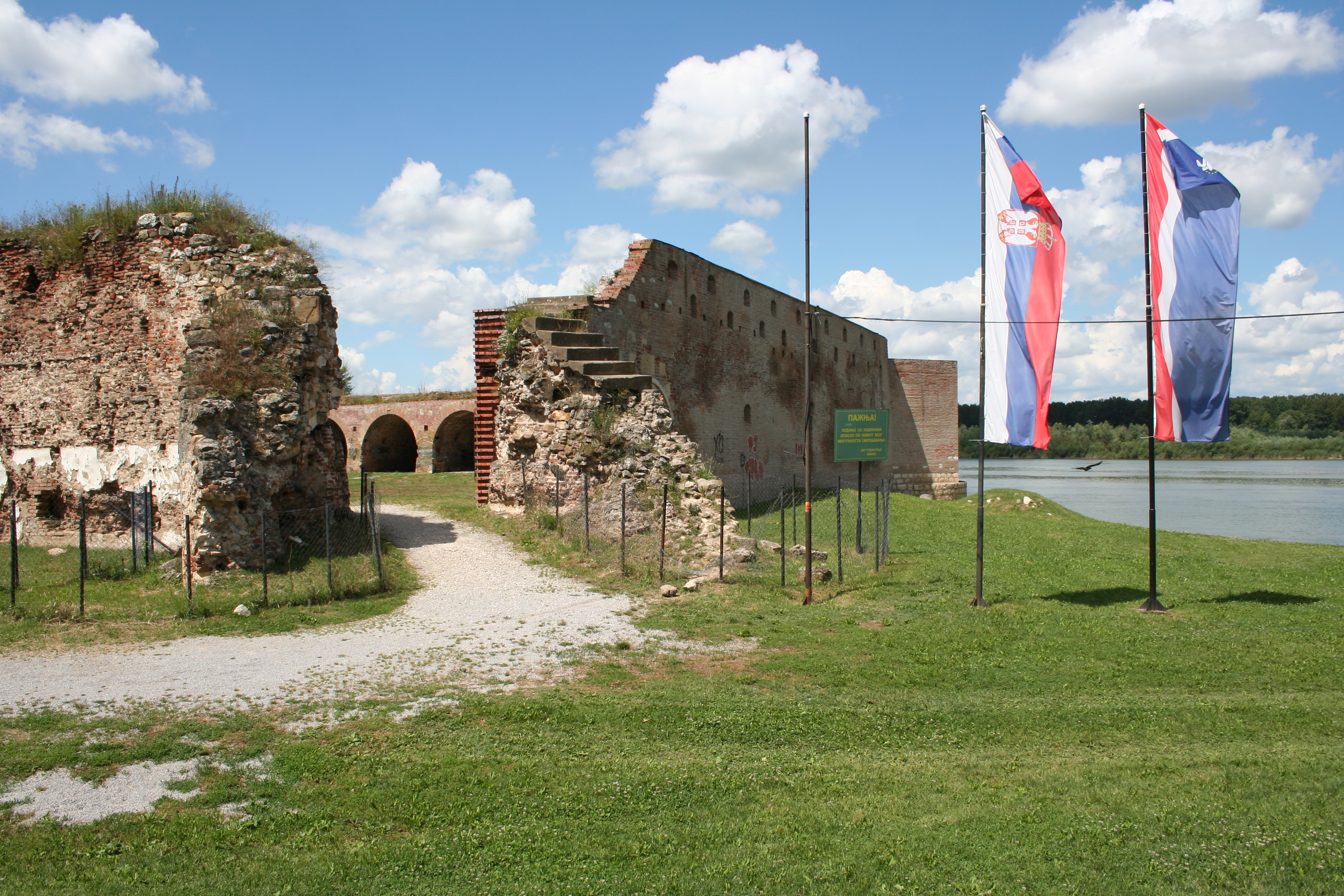

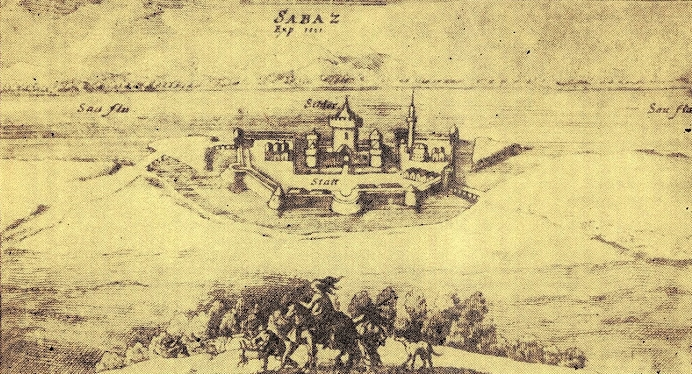
