= Kostajnik =

Coordinates: 44°25′36.84″N 19°17′53.88″E

- Village (Selo)
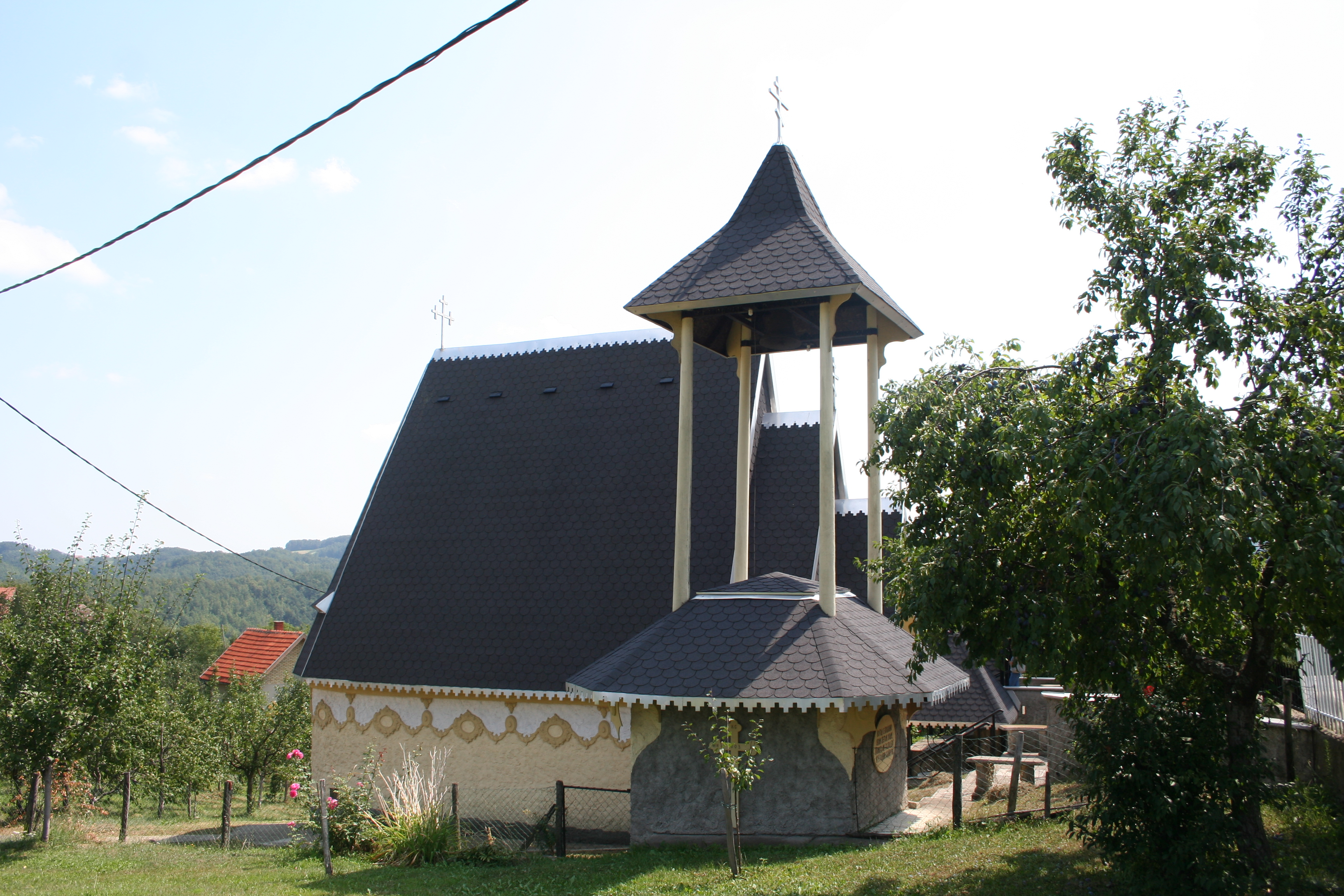
- Interactive map of Kostajnik
- Country: Serbia
- Municipality: Krupanj
- Time zone: UTC+1 (CET)
  - Summer (DST): UTC+2 (CEST)

Kostajnik (Serbian Cyrillic: Костајник) is a village in Serbia. It is situated in the Krupanj municipality, in the Mačva District of Central Serbia. Kostajnik is notable for being a fortified village since 1445. The village had a Serb ethnic majority and a population of 1,048 in 2002.

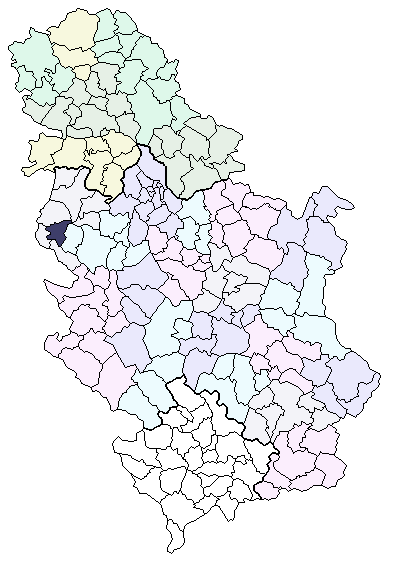
Location of the Krupanj municipality in Serbia

== Historical population ==
- 1948: 1,431
- 1953: 1,621
- 1961: 1,671
- 1971: 1,506
- 1981: 1,364
- 1991: 1,264
- 2002: 1,048

== See also ==
- List of places in Serbia
