= Tičar =

Tičar is a Slovene surname. Notable people with the surname include:

- Josip Tičar (1875–1946), Slovenian physician and mountaineer
- Rok Tičar (born 1989), Slovenian ice hockey player
