= Pomijača =

Pomijača Помијача (Serbian)
- Village (Selo)
- Location within Serbia
- Coordinates: 44°31′N 19°32′E
- Country: Serbia
- District: Mačva District
- Municipality: Loznica

Population (2002)
  - Total: 201
- Time zone: UTC+1 (CET)
  - Summer (DST): UTC+2 (CEST)

Pomijača is a village in the municipality of Loznica, Serbia. According to the 2002 census, the village has a population of 201 people.
