= Jarebice (Loznica) =

Jarebice Јаребице (Serbian)
- Village (Selo)
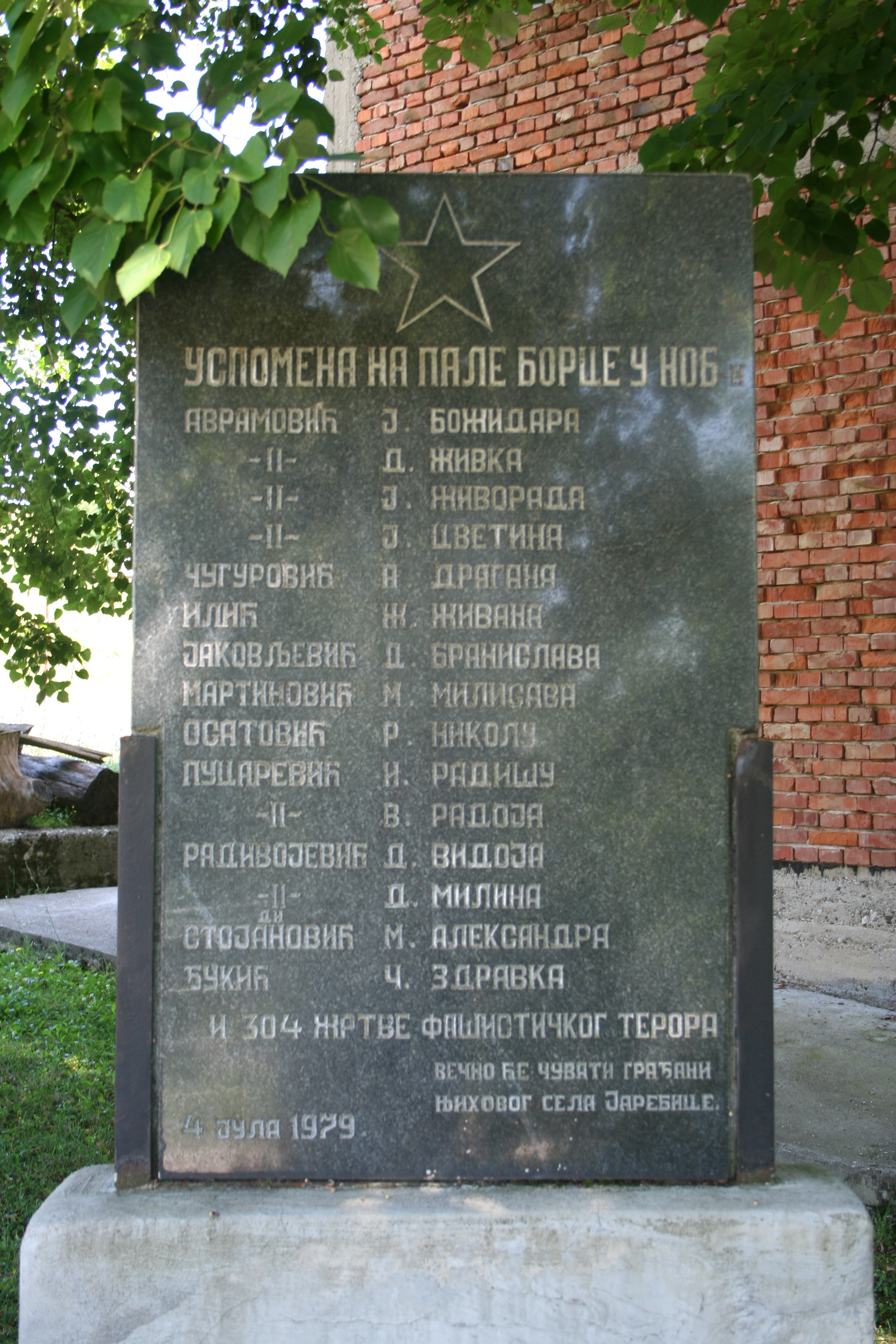

- Location within Serbia
- Coordinates: 44°32′N 19°25′E
- Country: Serbia
- District: Mačva District
- Municipality: Loznica
- Time zone: UTC+1 (CET)
  - Summer (DST): UTC+2 (CEST)

Jarebice is a village in the municipality of Loznica, Serbia. According to the 2002 census, the village has a population of people.
