= Captaincy (Ottoman) =

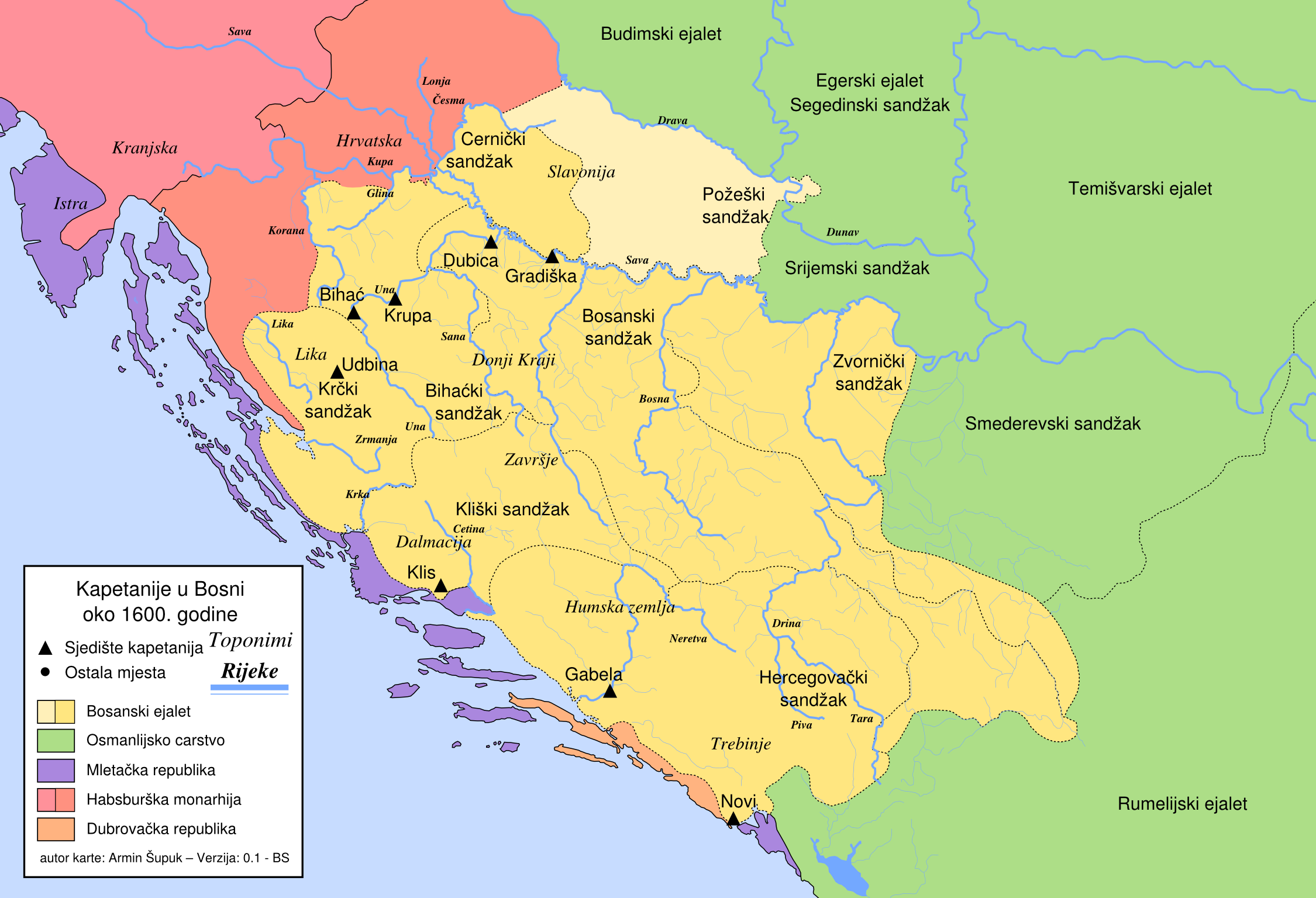
Captaincies (triangular symbol) in the year 1600.

The captaincy (Turkish: kaptanlık, kapudanlık, Serbo-Croatian: kapetanija, kapetanluk) was a military–administrative unit within the Bosnia Eyalet of the Ottoman Empire. The Ottoman captaincy was a sub-division within a sanjak and existed exclusively in the territory of the Bosnia Eyalet from the 16th century until 1835. It was headed by a captain who commanded the garrison of at least one fortress and exercised authority over the surrounding district. The institution developed along the Habsburg–Ottoman and Venetian–Ottoman frontiers and later spread into the interior of Bosnia. By the late 18th and early 19th century there were around forty captaincies covering much of the eyalet, especially in border regions along the Sava, Una and Neretva rivers. The system was abolished in 1835 as part of Ottoman centralising reforms, but leading captaincy families continued to play an important role in Bosnian politics, most notably in the Bosnian uprising led by captain Husein Gradaščević.

== Etymology ==
The Serbo-Croatian word kapetan is part of a wider South Slavic and European family of terms for "captain". It is generally derived from international forms such as German kapitän and French capitaine, which ultimately go back to Medieval Latin capitaneus (“leader, chief”), formed from Latin caput ("head"). The Serbo-Croatian word for "captaincy", kapetanija, denotes the territory or district under the authority of a kapetan and is formed from the personal title with the Slavic territorial suffix -ija. In Croatian-Hungarian military terminology the word kapetanija was also used for frontier captaincies in the Military Frontier; Bosnian historians note that the Ottoman Bosnian kapetanije developed in contact with this institution along the Sava and Una frontiers, although they formed part of the Ottoman administrative system and followed its legal framework.

== Organisation ==
The kaptan or kapudan ("captain", Serbo-Croatian: kapetan) was the head of the captaincy and normally resided in a fortified town (Serbo-Croatian: grad) or tower (Serbo-Croatian: kula) located within the district. In each captaincy there was at least one masonry fortress and one tower, and in some cases additional smaller wooden blockhouses (Turkish: çardak, Serbo-Croatian: čardak). In Ottoman legal terms the kaptan held an office (Turkish: ocaklık) which combined military command with certain fiscal and police powers. Initially captains were appointed by the central authorities, but from the 17th and especially the 18th century the offices became de facto hereditary within prominent Bosnian Muslim families. Many captaincies were held for generations by the same lineage, which strengthened local aristocracies and made the captain a key figure in provincial politics.

The primary task of the captaincy was local defence. The captain commanded the permanent garrison (mustahfiz or neferi) of the main fortress and any subordinate forts within the district. In wartime he raised additional forces from the surrounding rural population and coordinated operations with the provincial governor (sanjakbey, vali or pasha). In addition to frontier defence, captains were responsible for guarding important roads and river crossings, preventing banditry, supervising customs posts and sometimes escorting caravans. Their troops were used to maintain public order and to implement certain judicial decisions, which gave the captaincies a significant policing role alongside the kadi (judge) and other Ottoman officials.

The captaincies were financed by a combination of imperial stipends and local revenues. In some cases the captain held a tax farm (mukataa or ocakluk) whose income was tied to the office, while in others he received a regular pay comparable to the revenue of a ziamet. Every captain and soldier in the service of a captaincy was entitled to wages, although archival records and later accounts note that payment could be delayed for months or even years. Over time many captains treated their fiscal rights as quasi-private property, using them to support extended households and retainers.

Although the captaincy was not a formal judicial unit, captains exercised influence over local dispute settlement, especially in matters related to military service, security and taxation. Their authority occasionally brought them into conflict with kadis and with centrally appointed governors, contributing to the distinct political position of Bosnia within the empire. Because most captaincies became hereditary, the captaincy system fostered a provincial military nobility whose power rested on control over fortified seats, local armed men and certain fiscal rights. Families such as the Gradaščević of Gradačac, the Rizvanbegović of Stolac and the Sijerčić of Trebinje used their positions to build regional influence that could at times rival that of centrally appointed governors. Historians note that the captaincies formed a dense network of local power centers, giving Bosnia a level of provincial particularism and autonomy not seen in most other Ottoman provinces of the time. This structure produced a class of entrenched military elites who combined Ottoman legal authority with local legitimacy.

The territory of a captaincy typically included the fortress, its immediate settlement, nearby villages and sometimes smaller fortified posts. Because captaincy boundaries did not always coincide with those of judicial districts, a single kadiluk could contain several captaincies, while some captaincies extended across parts of different kadiluks. Captaincies normally took their names from the fortress in which they were established rather than from the settlement at its foot. Kreševljaković notes, for example, that the captaincy based at the medieval fortress above Stolac was officially called the Vidoška captaincy after the Vidoški town, while the Duvno captaincy was officially known as Seddi-džedid after the newly built Ottoman fortification of that name. Official names did not change even when the seat of a captaincy moved to another town; for example, the Kamengrad captaincy later shifted its centre to Majdan but retained its original name.

== Captaincies ==
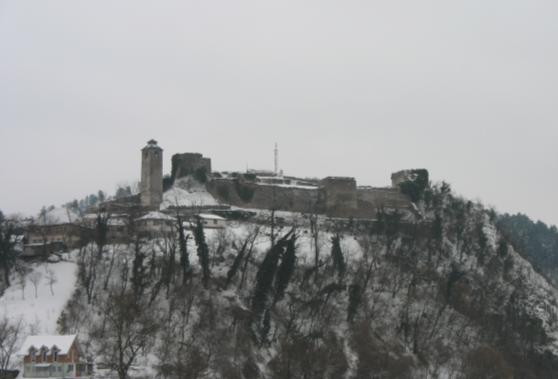
The Maglaj fortress, seat of the Maglaj kapetanija

A continuous chain of captaincies guarded the northern border of Bosnia along the Sava River, facing the Habsburg Military Frontier. Important Sava captaincies included Gradiška, Brod, Dubica and Kostajnica, each centred on fortified towns controlling river crossings and ferry points. Further west, in the Una valley, captaincies such as Bihać, Ostrožac and Bosanska Krupa formed a second defensive line against incursions from Croatia and Lika. Contemporary and later descriptions often single out the Krupa captaincy as one of the earliest and most important frontier districts in north-western Bosnia.

In the Sanjak of Herzegovina, captaincies were established at key strongholds along the Neretva and in the hinterland, including Ljubuški, Počitelj, Trebinje and Gabela. The Ljubuški captaincy, whose seat was a hilltop fortress above the town, is documented from the 17th century and played a role in local defence and trade control between the Adriatic coast and the interior. Other southern captaincies, such as those of Trebinje and Počitelj, guarded approaches from the Venetian Dalmatian coast and the Bay of Kotor. Their commanders were frequently involved in diplomacy, intelligence gathering and negotiations regarding border incidents with Venetian and later Austrian authorities.

From the 18th century onward, a number of captaincies were created in the Bosnian interior along major roads and in economically important towns, including Gradačac, Tešanj, Maglaj and Zvornik. These units combined defensive functions with supervision of trade routes and urban markets. The Gradačac captaincy became particularly prominent at the turn of the 19th century under the Gradaščević family. Its seat was the fortified complex with the tower later known as the "Tower of the Dragon of Bosnia" (Bosnian: Kula Zmaja od Bosne), which dominates the town. The complex is today protected as a national monument of Bosnia and Herzegovina.

== History ==
After the Ottoman conquest of the medieval Kingdom of Bosnia in 1463, the region was organised as the Sanjak of Bosnia and from 1580 also the Bosnia Eyalet. The standard Ottoman administrative hierarchy consisted of provinces (eyalet, vilayet), districts (sanjak), judicial districts (kadilik) and Timar (held by the sipahi cavalry).

As the Bosnian Eyalet expanded northwards during the Croatian–Ottoman wars, the Ottomans reached the Una and Sava rivers and came into direct contact with the Croatian-Hungarian institution of the captaincy on the opposite bank. Frontier warfare, refugee movements and fortification building gave the province a pronounced military character and encouraged the emergence of local military elites, which provided the social and institutional basis for the later captaincies.

The Ottoman captaincy system in Bosnia emerged gradually during the 16th century as a response to frontier defence needs. The first captaincies were established on the borders of the Bosnian Eyalet towards Habsburg Croatia and the Republic of Venice. The earliest captaincies that are securely attested by the end of the 16th century include the Bihać (Bihaćka), Gradiška, Krupa, Klis (Kliška) and Gabela (Gabeoska) captaincies; Novska, Dubica and Udbina probably also had their own captains by around 1600. The first captaincy explicitly mentioned in the sources is the Gradiška captaincy, headed by Džafer-beg, son of Malkoč-beg.

According to Kreševljaković, between 1606 and 1690 there were 29 captaincies in the Bosnian Eyalet, of which 23 were frontier captaincies and six interior ones, distributed among several sanjaks that at various times belonged to the eyalet (Požega, Bosnia, Bihać, Lika, Klis and Herzegovina). Many early captaincies were lost during the Cretan War (1645–1669) and the Great Turkish War (1683–1699), when Venetian and Habsburg forces captured a series of fortresses; after the Treaty of Karlowitz (1699) only twelve captaincies remained on the reduced Bosnian territory. In the 18th century the number of captaincies grew again as the frontier was stabilised and new strongholds and districts were organised in the interior. By the end of the 18th and in the early 19th century there were about 39 captaincies in the Bosnia Eyalet. Their territories were not identical with judicial districts: some captaincies were smaller than a kadiluk, while others covered parts of several kadiluks. This complex overlay of jurisdictions gave Bosnia a military-administrative structure that was, in comparative terms, peculiar to the province and not found in other Balkan eyalets.

From the late 18th century the Ottoman central government sought to limit the autonomy of provincial military and landowning elites. Attempts to regularise taxation, disband irregular troops and introduce new army units (nizam-i cedid and later Tanzimat reforms) brought Istanbul into repeated conflict with Bosnian captains and other notables. The most significant confrontation occurred in the Bosnian uprising of 1831–1832, led by Husein-kapetan Gradaščević of Gradačac. Many captaincy families supported his demands for Bosnian autonomy and resistance to reforms that threatened their positions. Although the movement was eventually defeated, it demonstrated the political power of the captaincies as a single group.

In 1835 the Ottoman authorities formally abolished the Bosnian captaincies, transferring their military functions to newly organised regular units and weakening the hereditary power of the captaincy families. Some former captains or their descendants retained social and economic influence as large landowners and continued to play a role in Bosnian public life under both Ottoman and later Austro-Hungarian rule.

== Legacy ==
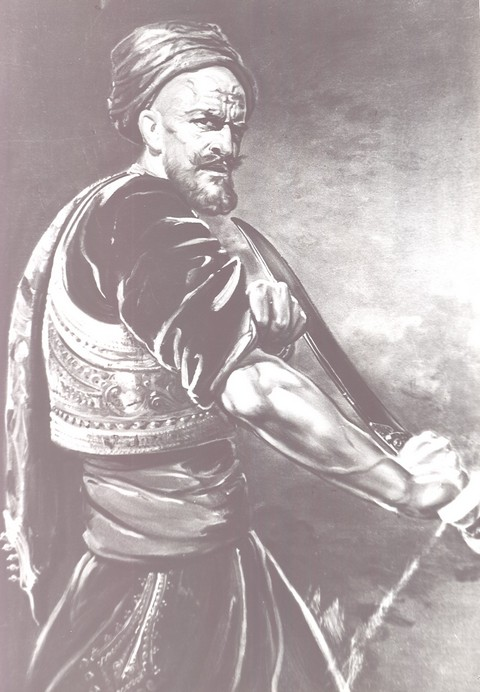
Kristian Kreković's painting of Husein Gradaščević. Often called "Husein-kapetan"

The heritage of the captaincy system are preserved in numerous fortresses, towers and place names across Bosnia and Herzegovina. Former captaincy seats such as Gradačac, Ljubuški, Počitelj, Tešanj, Maglaj, Ostrožac and others retain prominent fortified complexes that dominate the urban landscape and are often protected as national monuments.

In Bosnian cultural memory, the captains, especially figures like Husein-kapetan Gradaščević, are frequently portrayed as defenders of local autonomy and as symbols of pre-modern Bosnian statehood. Their residences and fortresses have become sites of historical commemoration and tourism, contributing to contemporary interpretations of Bosnian identity and heritage.

== See also ==
- Military Frontier

== Sources ==
- Hadžić, Ismet (2016). "Povijesni kontinuitet razvoja državnosti Bosne i Hercegovine". Mostariensia. 20 (1): 115–134.
- Hickok, Michael (2023). Ottoman Military Administration in Eighteenth-Century Bosnia. BRILL. pp. 58-. ISBN 978-90-04-66110-3.
- Kamberović, Husnija (2003). Begovski zemljišni posjedi u Bosni i Hercegovini od 1878. do 1918. godine. Sarajevo: Institut za historiju.
- Kreševljaković, Hamdija (1991) [1980]. Izabrana djela I: Kapetanije u Bosni i Hercegovini. Sarajevo: Veselin Masleša.
- Malcolm, Noel (1994). Bosnia: A Short History. London: Macmillan. ISBN 9780333616789.
- Šabanović, Hazim (1982). Bosanski pašaluk: postanak i upravna podjela. Sarajevo: Svjetlost.
