= Klupci =

Klupci Клупци (Serbian)
- Village (Selo)
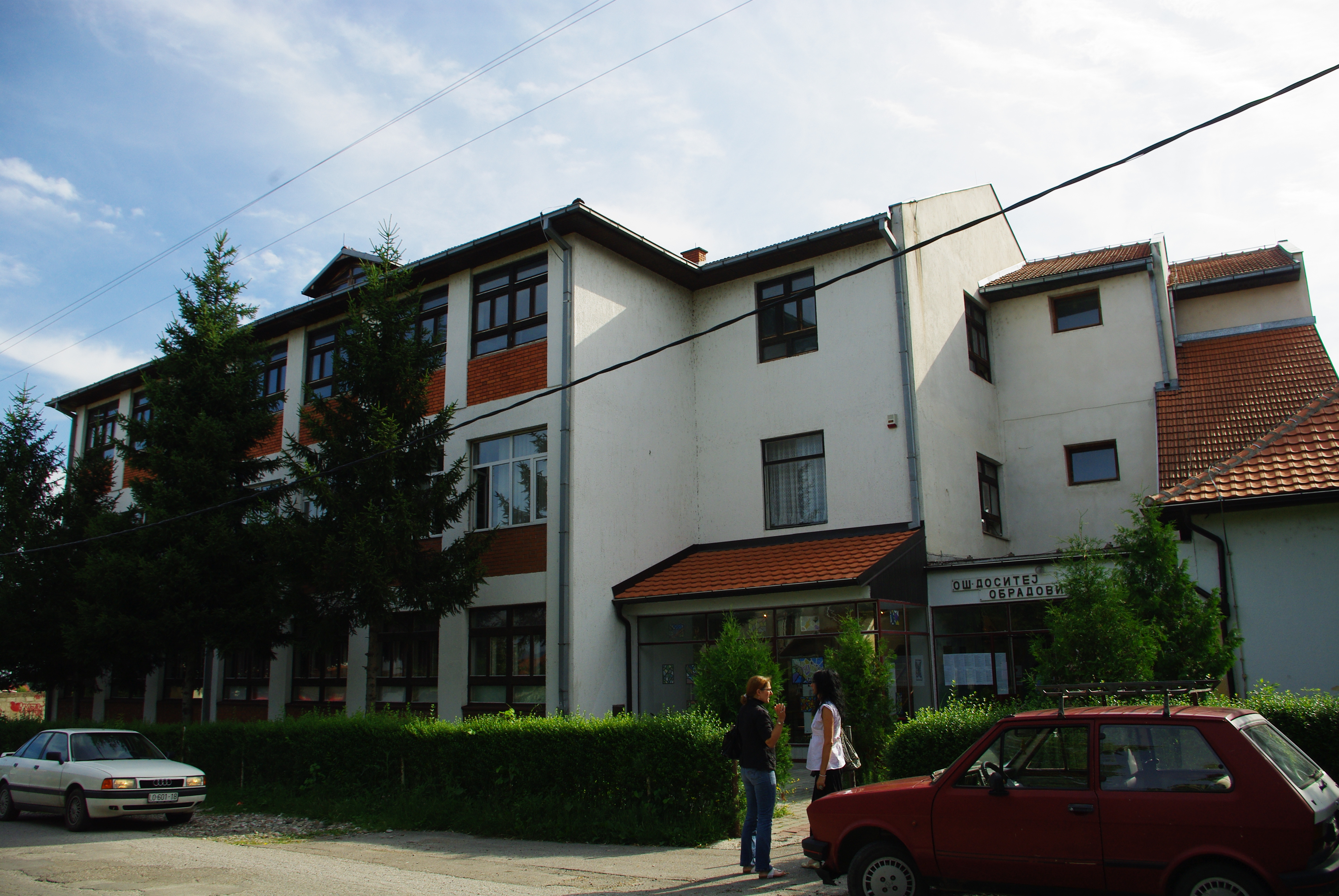
- Elementary school Dositej Obradović

- Location within Serbia
- Coordinates: 44°31′53″N 19°15′07″E
- Country: Serbia
- District: Mačva District
- Municipality: Loznica
- Elevation: 157 m (515 ft)

Population (2022)
  - Total: 6,609
- Time zone: UTC+1 (CET)
  - Summer (DST): UTC+2 (CEST)
- Postal code: 15300
- Website: www.klupci.com

Klupci (Serbian Cyrillic: Клупци) is a locality of Serbia located in the municipality of Loznica, district of Mačva, not far from the Bosnian border.

== Klupci the village ==
According to the 2022 census, the village had a population of 6,609 inhabitants. In spite of the number of its inhabitants, Klupci is officially classified among the villages of Serbia.

The elementary school is named after the Serbian philosopher and linguist Dositej Obradović.

== Sports ==
Klupci also has a football team Radnički, formerly called Radnički Stobex. They spent two seasons in the Second League of Serbia and Montenegro, the then second tier in Serbia and Montenegro's football league.

== See also ==
- Loznica
- Museum in Loznica
