= Sokolska planina =

Mountain in Serbia

- Location within Serbia

Highest point
- Elevation: 973 m (3,192 ft)
- Coordinates: 44°16′58″N 19°27′35″E

Geography
- Location: Western Serbia
- Parent range: Dinaric Alps

Sokolska planina (Serbian: Соколска планина) is a mountain in western Serbia, located between Osečina, Ljubovija and Krupanj. Its highest peak, Rožanj, has an elevation of 973 meters above sea level.

== See also ==
- List of mountains in Serbia
