= Sanjak of Zvornik =

Coordinates: 44°23′3″N 19°6′9″E

Sanjak of Zvornik Zvornik Sandžak
- Sanjak of the Ottoman Empire (Rumelia Eyalet 1481-1580, Bosnia Eyalet 1580-1833, 1865-1867, Bosnia Vilayet 1867-1878), Austro-Hungarian occupation 1878-1882
- 1481 (reestablished in 1865)–1832 (dissolved in 1882)
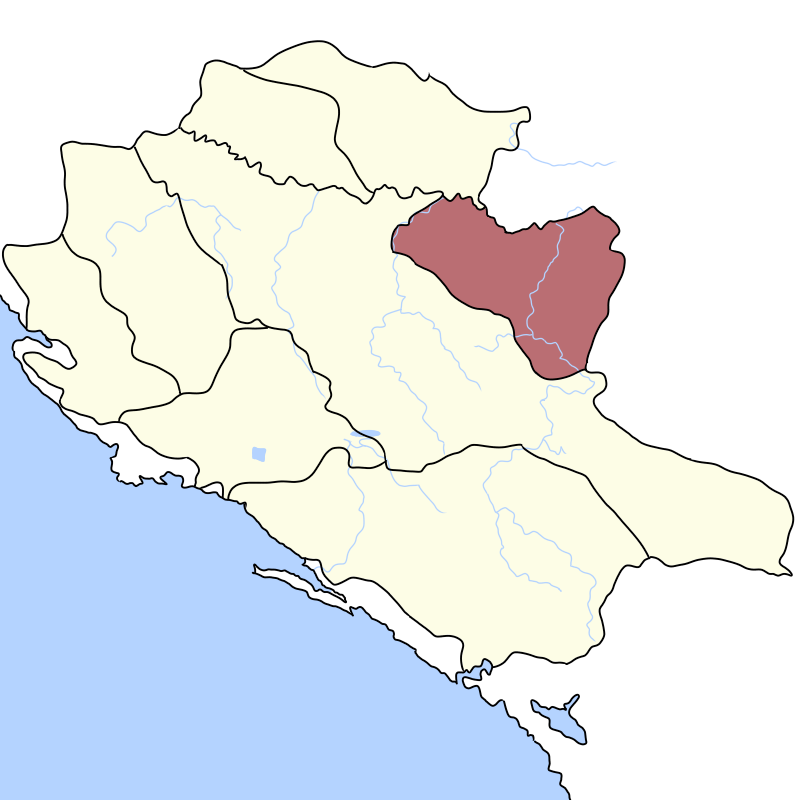
- Sanjak of Zvornik in 1609
- Capital: Zvornik (1481-1832); Donja Tuzla (1865-1882)
- History
  - Established: 1481 (reestablished in 1865)
  - Disestablished: 1832 (dissolved in 1882)
Preceded by	Succeeded by
Sanjak of Bosnia (1463-1481); Banate of Srebrenik	District of Tuzla; Condominium of Bosnia and Herzegovina
- Today part of: Bosnia and Herzegovina; Serbia

The Sanjak of Zvornik (Turkish: İzvornik Sancağı, Serbo-Croatian: Zvornički sandžak) was one of the sanjaks in the Ottoman Empire with Zvornik (in modern-day Bosnia and Herzegovina) as its administrative centre. It was divided into four different districts: Žepče, Maglaj, Tuzla and Kladanj. The sanjak was created in 1480–1481 and was dissolved in 1832.

== Establishment ==
The Sanjak of Zvornik was established in 1481 from the northern territories of the Sanjak of Bosnia and the Banate of Srebrenik (which was ruled by the Kingdom of Hungary) after the Ottoman conquest of the areas of Usora and Soli.

== Administration ==
The sanjak had ten nahiyas according to the 1520 defter, including Šubin, Srebrenica, Budimir, Kušlat, Zvornik, Gostilj, Drametin, Donja Tuzla, Gornja Tuzla on the left (Bosnian) side of the Drina, and the big nahiya of Brvenik on the right (Serbian) side of the Drina. The sanjak had 31 nahiyas according to the 1533 defter, a much larger territory than in the previous defter, and included Šubin, Srebrenica, Budimir (Ludmer), Kušlat, Zvornik, Završ, Donja Tuzla, Gornja Tuzla, Visori, Jasenica, Smoluća, Srebrnik, Soko and Nenavište (Gradačac) on the left side, and Brvenik, Gošćanica, Krupanj, Bohorina, Jadar, Ptičar, Rađevina, Šabac, Donja Mačva and Gornja Mačva on the right side.

The sanjak had 33 nahiyas throughout the 17th century (as registered in the 1604 defter), including Bijeljina, Drametin, Donja Tuzla, Gornja Tuzla, Gostil, Ptičar, Sapna, Smoluća, Sokol, Spreča, Srebrenica, Gračanica, Gradačac, Jasenica, Koraj, Kušlat, Ludmer (Budimir), Nenavište, Srebrenik, Teočak, Visori, Završ and Zvornik on the left (Bosnian) side of the Drina, while on the right (Serbian) side of the Drina there were Bogurdelen (Šabac), Bohorina, Brvenik, Donja Mačva, Gornja Mačva, Gošćanica, Jadar, Krupanj, Rađevina and Šubin. There were nine judicial-administrative units, kadiluks (under the supervision of the kadi, judge), including Zvornik, Memlehatejn (Tuzla), Srebrenica, Gračanica, Osat, Bijeljina, Bihorina (Vrhovina), Jadar with Ptičar and Bugurdelen (Šabac).

== History ==
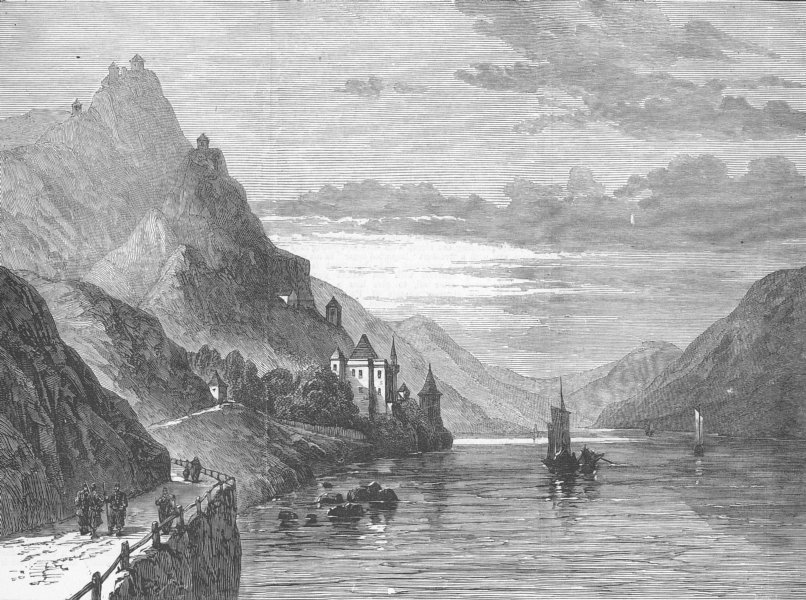
Engraving of Zvornik from 1876

The sanjak of Zvornik was established in late 1480 or early 1481 following the attacks of Serbian despot Vuk Grgurević on Srebrenica and Sarajevo. With the establishment of the Budin Eyalet (1541), the sanjak of Zvornik was part of it for a time. Since 1580 it was organized into the Bosnia Eyalet. The sanjak was one of six sanjaks with most developed shipbuilding (besides Vidin, Nicopolis, Požega, Smederevo and Mohács).

The sanjak was dissolved in 1832, its remaining Ottoman territory ceded to the Sanjak of Bosnia.

== Sources ==
- Bašić, Kemal (2021). Zvornički sandžak u XVII stoljeću. Univerzitet u Sarajevu, Institut za historiju.
- Fotić, Aleksandar (1988). "Reviews: TWO EARLIEST LAND REGISTERS OF THE SANJAK OF ZVORNIK (FROM 1519 AND 1533)". Balcanica. XVIII–XIX: 426–428.
- Šabanović, Hazim (1959). Bosanski pašaluk: postanak i upravna podjela. Oslobodenje.
