= List of Ottoman military governors of Belgrade Fortress =

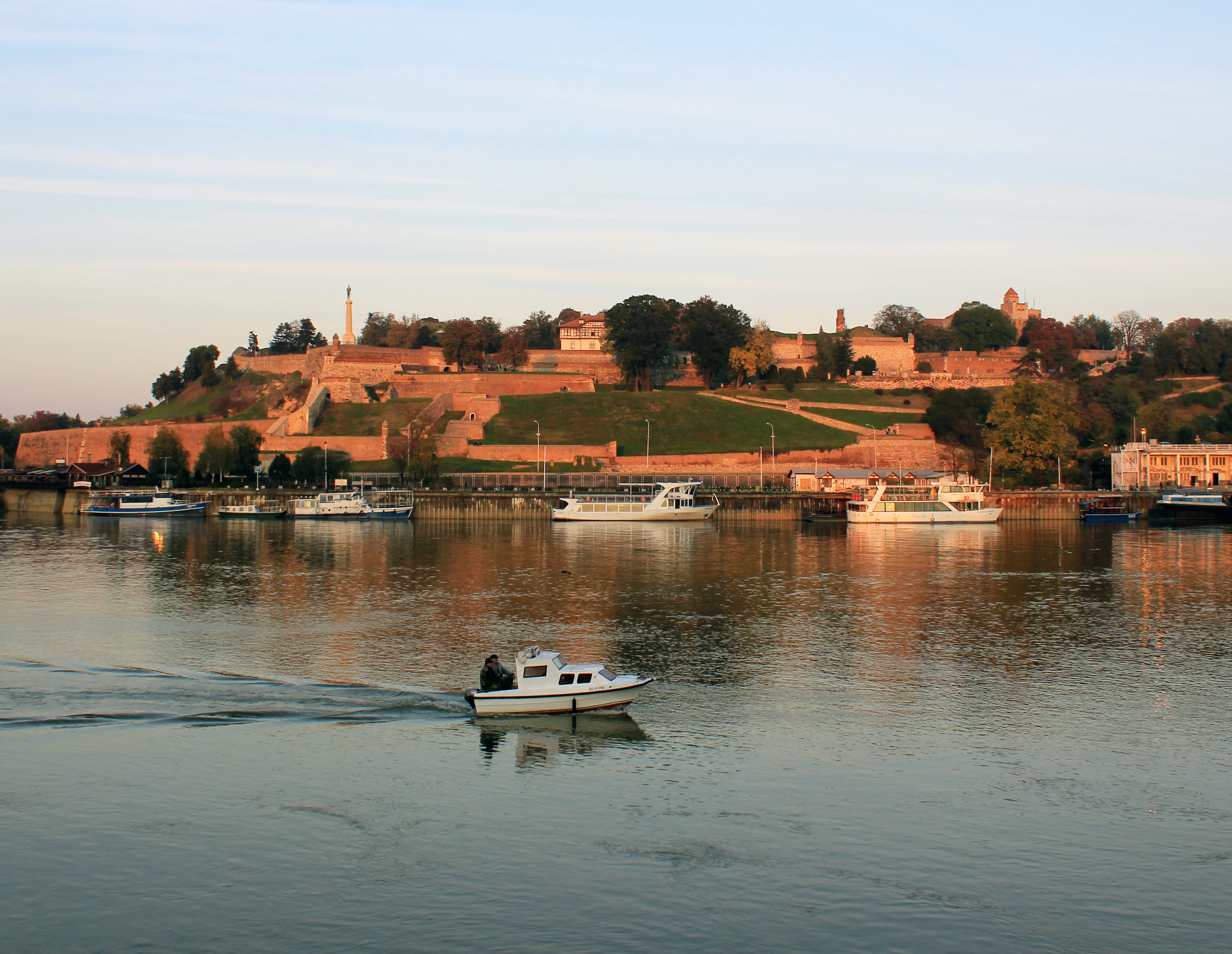
Panorama of Belgrade Fortress

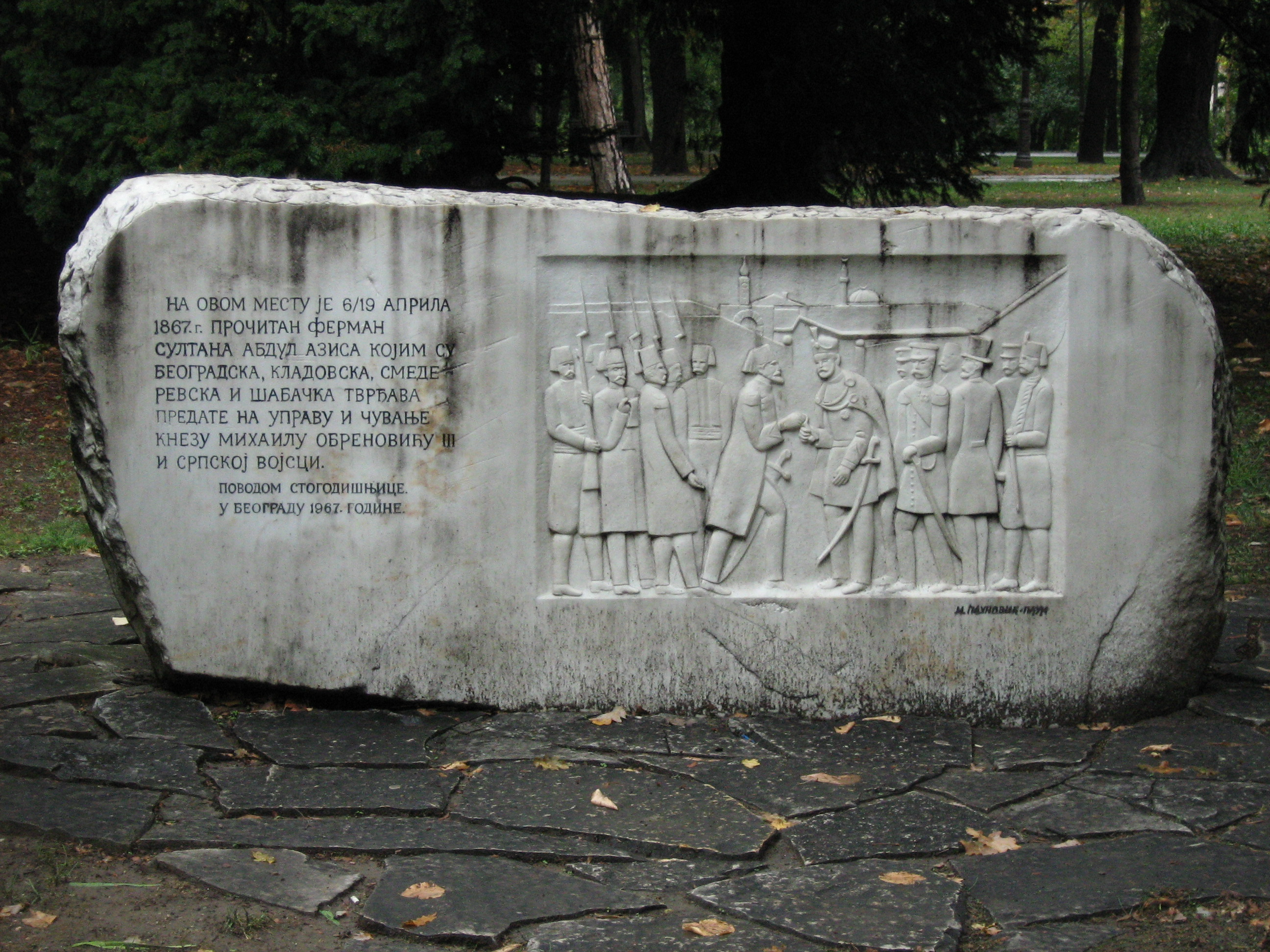
The Keys Handover Memorial in Kalemegdan Park, on the place where Ali Reza Pasha, the last Ottoman military commander, handed over the keys of Belgrade Fortress to Prince Mihailo in 1867

This article lists the Ottoman military governors of Belgrade Fortress from the establishment of the autonomous Principality of Serbia in 1817, after the Second Serbian Uprising, until the withdrawal of Ottoman military garrison from Belgrade Fortress in 1867, simultaneously with the withdrawal of other remaining Ottoman garrisons from Serbian fortresses (namely Šabac, Smederevo, Kladovo, Užice and Soko Grad).

== List ==
Name	Period
Marashli Ali Pasha	6 November 1817 – September 1821
Abdurrahman Pasha	September 1821 – 1827
Hüseyin Pasha	1827–1833
Vedyehi Veci Pasha	1833–1835
Yusuf Muhlis Pasha	1835–1837
Hüshrev Pasha Samakuli	December 1837 – January 1841
Haci Mehmed Kamil Pasha	January 1841 – October 1843
Hafiz Mehmed Pasha	October 1843 – January 1846
Mehmed Vecihi Pasha	January 1846 – February 1847
Selim Sirri Pasha	February 1847 – July 1848
Hafiz Ahmed Pasha	July 1848 – October 1848
Hasan Pasha	October 1848 – May 1850
Mehmed Vasif Pasha	May 1850 – April 1852
Mehmed Hurshid Pasha	April 1852 – July 1852
Mehmed Besim Pasha	July 1852 – February 1854
Ahmed Izzet Pasha	February 1854 – January 1855
Aziz Pasha	January 1855 – January 1857
Hasan Hüsnü Pasha	January 1857 – July 1857
Sherif Topal Osman Pasha	July 1857 – January 1861
Hurshid Pasha	1861
Reşid Pasha	April 1861 – 1863
Eyub Pasha	1863–1864
Ali Pasha	1865–1866
Ali Reza Pasha	1866 – 19 April 1867

== See also ==
- History of Belgrade
  - Timeline of Belgrade
- 1862 Serbian–Ottoman clashes in Belgrade
  - Čukur Fountain incident
  - 1862 bombardment of Belgrade
- Exodus of Muslims from Serbia (1862)
- 1867 withdrawal of Ottoman garrison from Belgrade

== Sources ==
- World Statesmen – Serbia
