= List of Protected Historic Landmarks (Serbia) =

Protected Historic Landmarks (Serbian: Заштићена знаменита места/Zaštićena znamenita mesta) are historical places in the Republic of Serbia that have the third level of the State protection.

Those are part of the Cultural Heritage of Serbia protection list.

Photo	Name	Date	Municipality/City	Location, Address	Note	Ref(s)
	Keys Handover Memorial	1967, marking an 1867 spot	Belgrade	Stari Grad, Kalemegdan		
	Black Peak Lawn	10. Април 1943	Peć	NW from the town of Peć	Located in disputed region of Kosovo	
	Memorial Park with monuments to Boro Vukmirović and Ramiz Sadiku	July 1937	Prizren	Landovica	Located in disputed region of Kosovo	

== See also ==
- Cultural Heritage of Serbia
- History of Serbia
