= Kozluk, Zvornik =

Coordinates: 44°30′06″N 19°06′45″E

Kozluk Козлук
- Village
- Interactive map of Kozluk
- Country: Bosnia and Herzegovina
- Entity: Republika Srpska
- Time zone: UTC+1 (CET)
  - Summer (DST): UTC+2 (CEST)

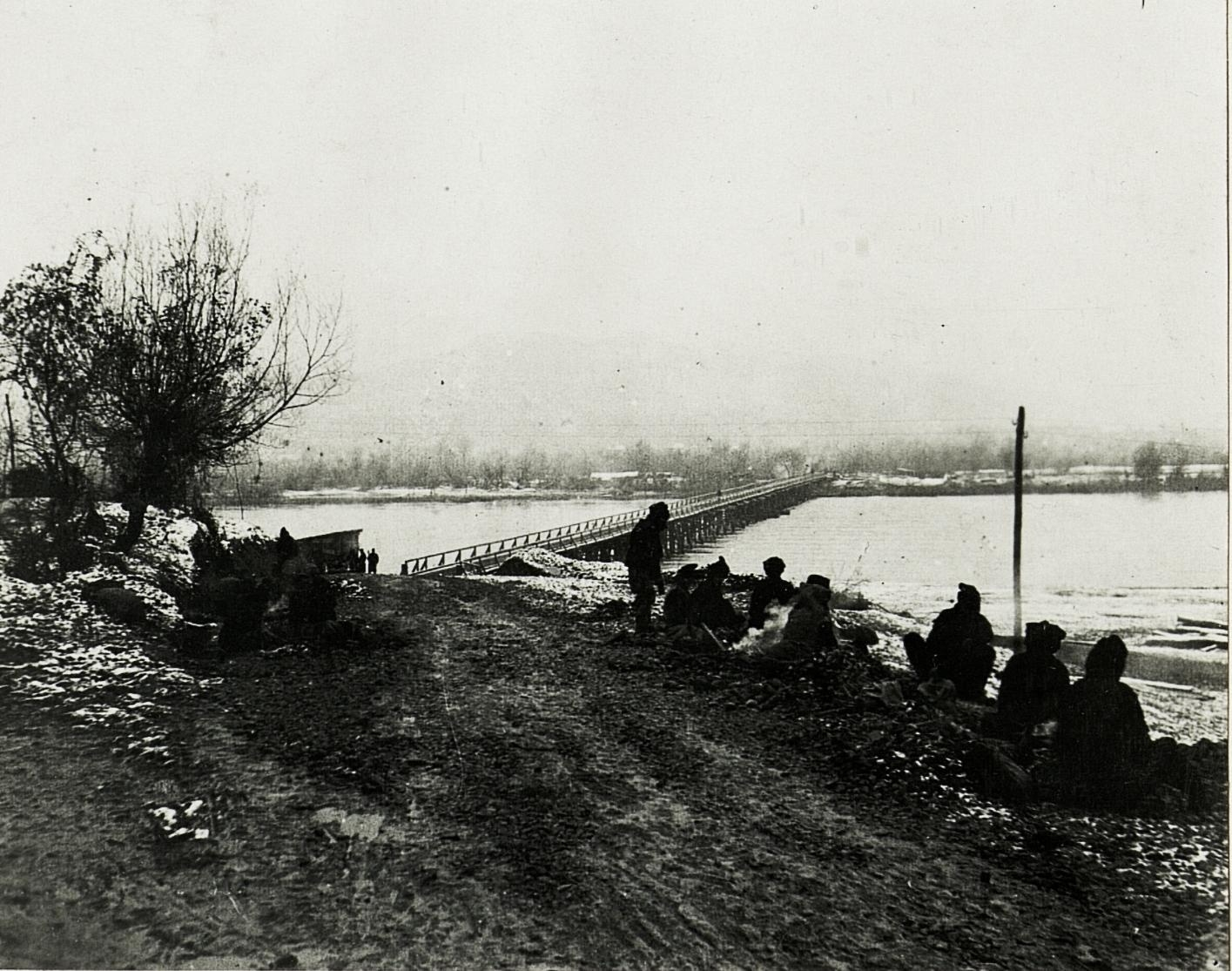
Bridge over the Drina River in Kozluk during the First World War

Kozluk is a village located in the Zvornik Municipality, Bosnia and Herzegovina. Kozluk is an ethnic Bosniak majority village.

== Geographical location ==
The village is located in the northeastern part of Bosnia and Herzegovina in the Podrinje (also known as Drina Valley) region. Kozkuk is situated on the left bank of the Drina river on the eastern slopes of the Majevica mountain range and lies on the road between Zvornik and Bijeljina.

== History ==
Remains of a dry wall fortification from the Neolithic era were found at the site of the village.

The surrounding areas of Kozluk were inhabited by various groups throughout ancient and prehistoric times, among them Illyrian and Celtic tribes. Later these areas were part of the Roman empire until the collapse of the western roman empire. Afterwards they were conquered and ruled for some periods of time by Ostrogoths, Huns and Avars until finally being settled by Slavic speaking people from the 7th century onwards. These Slavs have since then dominated the Podrinje region and large parts of the Balkans both ethnically and linguistically even though they were ruled by non-Slavic foreigners for long periods of time. The site of modern Kozluk was also part of the medieval kingdom of Bosnia. In the wider area of Kozluk 15 stećaks were found distributed in four localities.

The Zvornik area was conquered by the Ottomans in 1460 and 20 years later the Zvornik sandžak was formed. Although it is not mentioned in the list of settlements inside the Zvornik sandžak from 1604, Kozluk began to develop in the 17th century as a caravan station on the Zvornik - Bijeljina - Rača road. The settlement was first mentioned in the records of French diplomat Kikle, who stayed in Kozluk in 1658 on his way to Istanbul. According to Kikle there was a mosque in Kozluk at the time, which bore the name of Mehmed Çelebi as their founder. In 1664 Kozluk was also visited by Evliya Çelebi, who stated that Kozluk was a small town with a few shops. Evliya Çelebi also wrote that Kozluk got its name "because there are many walnut trees (Kozlidže) growing there". According to another tradition it got its name from a type of wild plant that the people called "kozjim lukom" or "goat's onion" in English. It should also be noted, that they are multiple places called Kozluk in Turkey. After the foundation of the Zvornik captaincy, a tower was built in the center of the settlement near the mosque.

The 1862 Kanlıca Conference ordered among other things the expulsion of the remaining Muslim population from Serbia except for those willing to convert. 141 families with 373 male members moved from Sokol, a ruined town and fortress between Krupnje and Ljubovija, to Kozluk. Except for 6 Romani families consisting of 13 individual members, all the banished households were southern Slavic people. Their surnames were: Alajbegović, Alispahić, Arapović, Banjanović, Bašić, Čajkić, Ćatić, Dubočanin, Dudaković, Duraković, Delić, Fejzić, Grabovac, Hergić, Hadžialić, Topčagić, Haluga, Harambašić, Hadžimuratović, Hidić, Ibrišević, Isić, Išimović, Jakubović, Kupinić, Marhošević, Mekić, Mešanagić, Mulalić, Mulaibišević, Mutisagić, Palamarević, Pekmezović, Puškarević, Suljagić, Salihagić, Spahić, Šabić, Terzić and Uzunović. Families which moved to Kozluk at a later point: Brkić, Ekmečić, Hadžialić, Jahić, Mulaosmanović, Muratović, Memišević, Omerhodžić, Omerović and others.

During the time of Austro-Hungarian rule in Bosnia Kozluk was the seat of the municipality, which consisted of the following settlements: Baljkovica Donja, Dugi Dio, Jusići, Kraljevići, Petkovci, Sapna, Vitinica, Šetići, Tršić, Tabanci, Skočić, Roćević, Gornji Šepak and Donji Šepak. In the first years of Austro-Hungarian rule a police station, a post office and a school for cadets were opened followed in 1886 by an elementary school. At the beginning of the 20th century a madrasa was created. The wooden minaret of the mosque was replaced by one made off brick in 1903. In the same year the Orthodox Church of St. Apostles Peter and Paul was built, whose first priest, Petar Lazarević, was executed in August 1914 in Tuzla on suspicion of involvement in the Sarajevo assassination.

During the Kingdom of Yugoslavia Kozluk remained the seat of a municipality, but its territory decreased with the formation of new municipalities: Branjevo, Sapna and Grbavci. The Bosniak population mostly supported the Yugoslav Muslim Organization. In 1935, Husein Ćumavić from Zvornik was elected as deputy and Fehim Begtašević from Kozluk was elected as his second in command. At this time there were several shops in Kozluk, the Turkušin and Suljagić hans, two taverns and a dozen craft shops.

With the formation of the NDH in April 1941 a police station was built and the Ustaše and Croatian Home Guard established a base, which was led by Halim Spahić. Smaller crews of Croatian Home Guard also operated in the nearby settlements of Tršić and Roćević. From 1942 onwards a dissident group of workers operated in Kozluk, which through Pilica maintained contact with partisan units and occasionally with a similar group from Zvornik. Partisans entered Kozluk for the first time on July 7, 1943, without fighting, two days after the fall of Zvornik. From October 1943 until it finally fell into the hands of the partisans on February 20, 1945, there was constant fighting in the area of Kozluk and its surroundings. In March and April 1945 the Chetnik units that controlled most of the Kozluk municipality were destroyed. 300 people fought in the partisans, and 125 people from the Kozluk municipality were killed.

Kozluk municipality, which included the settlements of the northeastern part of today's Zvornik municipality towards Janja, was abolished in 1962. According to the 1961 census it had 17,461 inhabitants. The small town acquired electricity in 1953, making Kozluk the second settlement in the municipality (after Zvornik) to have electricity. The construction of a water supply system was completed in the late 1960s and the sewer system in the 1980s. The 8 km asphalt road to Kiseljak and the post office were built at the end of the 1950s and around 1980 Kozluk was connected to Zvornik and Bijeljina by a modern road. A new dispensary, which soon grew into a health station, was opened in 1958. A veterinary station, a pharmacy and an agricultural pharmacy were soon opened and a couple of residential buildings were built. The mosque was rebuilt in 1968, but the old minaret was kept. The "Vitinka" mineral water factory was opened in 1974. A new school building was built in 1960 and 14 years later another one was built with two stories, a gymnasium and a sports field.

The Bosniak population of Kozluk and Skočić was expelled to Hungary on June 26, 1992 and the mosque was soon demolished. In the period from April until the expulsion, 49 Bosniaks were either killed or have disappeared in Kozluk and Skočić. In Slovenia the "Drina Dragons" unit was formed by fighters from Kozluk and other settlements between Bijeljina and Zvornik. It had about 100 fighters. Upon arrival in the free territories of Zvornik on September 20, 1992, it became the 3rd company of the 1st Zvornik detachment. It became a maneuver unit with the creation of the 206th Mountain Brigade. With the formation of the 242nd Muslim Zvornik Light Brigade in August 1994, the Drina Dragons entered its composition.

Several mass graves with victims of the Srebrenica genocide were found in the wider area of Kozluk.

== Demographics ==
According to the 1895 census Kozluk had 909 inhabitants and in 1910 1,063. The number of Serbs increased sharply from 51 to 128. There was also a smaller Jewish community with 17 members that was influential in trade. Of the 1,063 inhabitants enumerated in 1910 217 lived in Čaršija, 341 in Jedrena, 248 in Luka, 167 in Potkraj and 90 in Marhoši.

The number of inhabitants in the 1953 census was 1,450.

Composition of the population - Kozluk settlement
	2013	1991	1981	1971
All	2004 (100%)	3017 (100%)	2652 (100%)	2115 (100%)
Bosniaks	1501 (74,90%)	2565 (84,02%)	2232 (84,16%)	1851 (87,52%)
Serbians	487 (24.30%)	302 (10,01%)	259 (9,766%)	248 (11,73%)
Undeclared	6 (0,299%)	-	-	-
Albanians	3 (0,15%)	-	1 (0,038%)	-
Yugoslavs	2 (0,1%)	76 (2,519%)	56 (2,112%)	-
Others	2 (0,1%)	71 (2,353%)	6 (0,266%)	5 (0,236%)
Croats	1 (0,05%)	3 (0,099%)	1 (0,038%)	3 (0,142%)
Orthodox Christians	1 (0,05%)	-	-	-
Unknown	1 (0,05%)	-	-	-
Romani	-	-	95 (3,582%)	-
Montenegrins	-	-	1 (0,038%)	5 (0,236%)
Hungarians	-	-	1 (0,038%)	3 (0,142%)

== Notable Individuals ==
- Ermin Bičakčić (1990 - ), footballer
- Nijaz Alispahić (1950 - 2024), writer
- Alija Uzunović (1945 - 2016)

== Literature ==
- Hudović, Mehmed (2000). Zvornik: Slike i bilješke iz prošlosti. Sarajevo: Udruženje građana općine Zvornik
- Uzunović, Alija; Banjanović, Nusret (1979). Kozluk Monografija. Tuzla: Mjesna zajednica Kozluk
