= Brezovo Polje =

Brezovo Polje may refer to:

- Brezovo Polje, Brčko, a village in Bosnia and Herzegovina
- Brezovo Polje, Croatia, a village near Glina, Croatia
