= Keys Handover Memorial =

Coordinates: 44.82°N 20.45°E

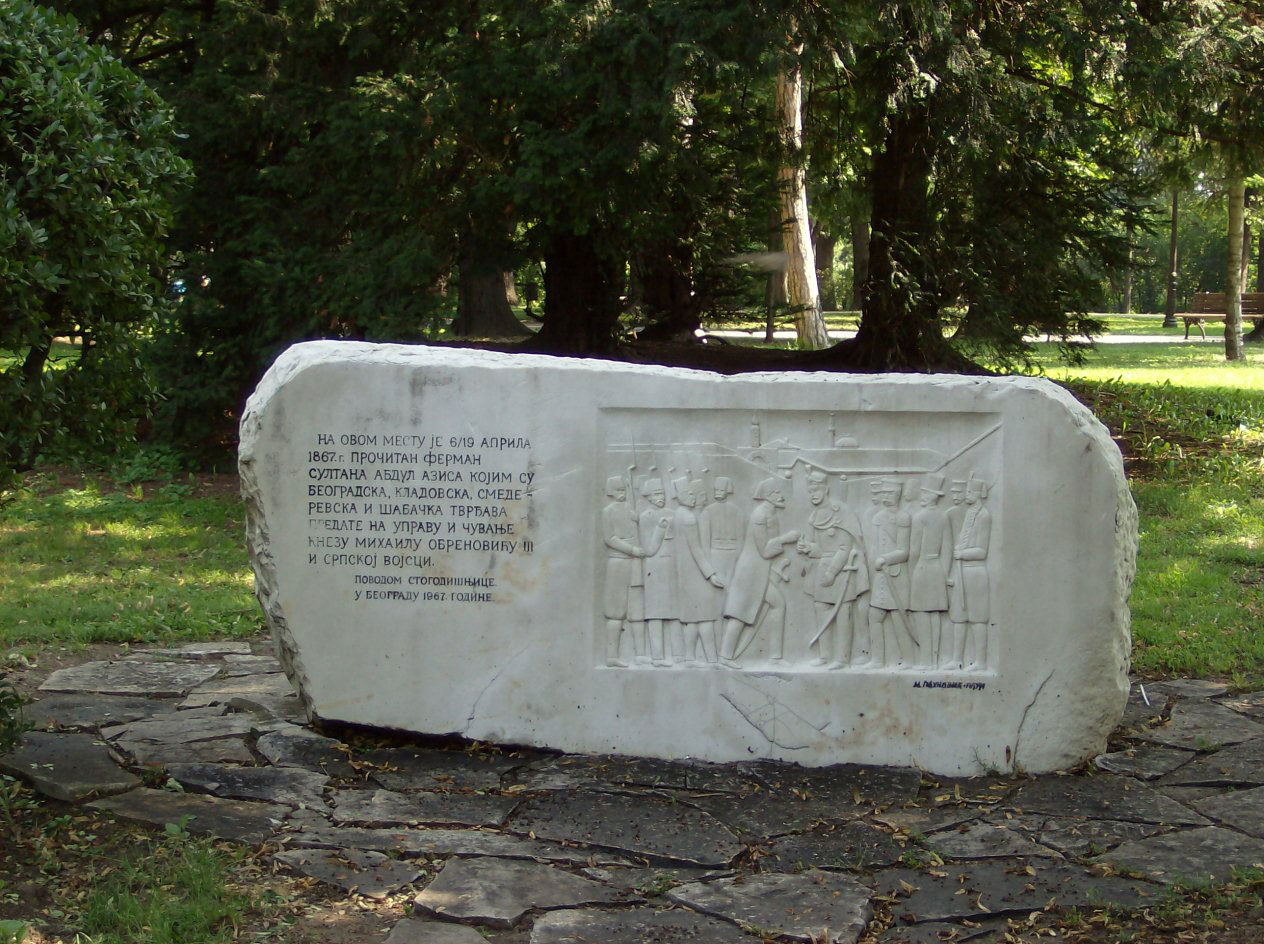
Keys Handover Memorial in Kalemegdan, Belgrade, Serbia.

The Keys Handover Memorial (Serbian: Место предаје кључева 1867. године, romanized: Mesto predaje ključeva 1867, godine, English: Place where keys were handed over in 1867) in Belgrade, Serbia, marks the spot where on 6 April 1867, the town keys of the several Serbian fortresses were given to Prince Mihailo Obrenović by the Ottoman Turks. That moment was an important step towards Serbian international recognition at the Treaty of Berlin in 1878.

The memorial was declared a Protected Historic Landmark in 1991, and it is protected by Republic of Serbia.

== History ==
The Keys Handover Memorial marks the place on Kalemegdan where a ceremonial, symbolic, handing over the keys of Belgrade, Smederevo, Šabac and Kladovo fortresses was made represent a material evidence which indirectly expresses the importance of the event in Serbian history. The symbolic handing over the keys to these cities, on the right side of the main entrance to Kalemegdan, followed by the after Prince Mihailo Obrenović received in Constantinople, on 30 March 1867 The decree of the Turkish Sultan Abdülaziz of the first, which the prince of the Serbian people and cities submitted for care and management. Return of the cities, although other Serbian vassal obligation stayed, such as paying tribute to the Sublime Porte and holding Turkish flags, meant overcoming yet another obstacle in obtaining complete independence; thus began a new phase in the life of the Serbs.

== Memorial ==
For the centennial of the event, a memorial was created in order to mark the spot for the future generations. A white marble block, created by Mihailo Paonović, was put in place in 1967, with a carved drawing by A. Srefanović. A celebration accompanied the occasion.

== See also ==
- Protected Historic Landmarks
- Tourism in Serbia
