= Kozluk (disambiguation) =

Kozluk is a district of Batman Province, Turkey.

Kozluk can also refer to:

- Kozluk, Zvornik, a village in Zvornik Municipality, Bosnia and Herzegovina
- Kozluk, Bayburt, a village in the Bayburt District, Bayburt Province, Turkey
- Kozluk, Düzce, a village in Düzce District, Düzce Province, Turkey
- Kozluk, Elâzığ, a village in Elazığ District, Elazığ Province, Turkey

== People with the name ==
- Rob Kozluk (born 1977), English footballer
