= Soko Monastery =

Monastery in Serbia

Coordinates: 44°16′02″N 19°25′34″E

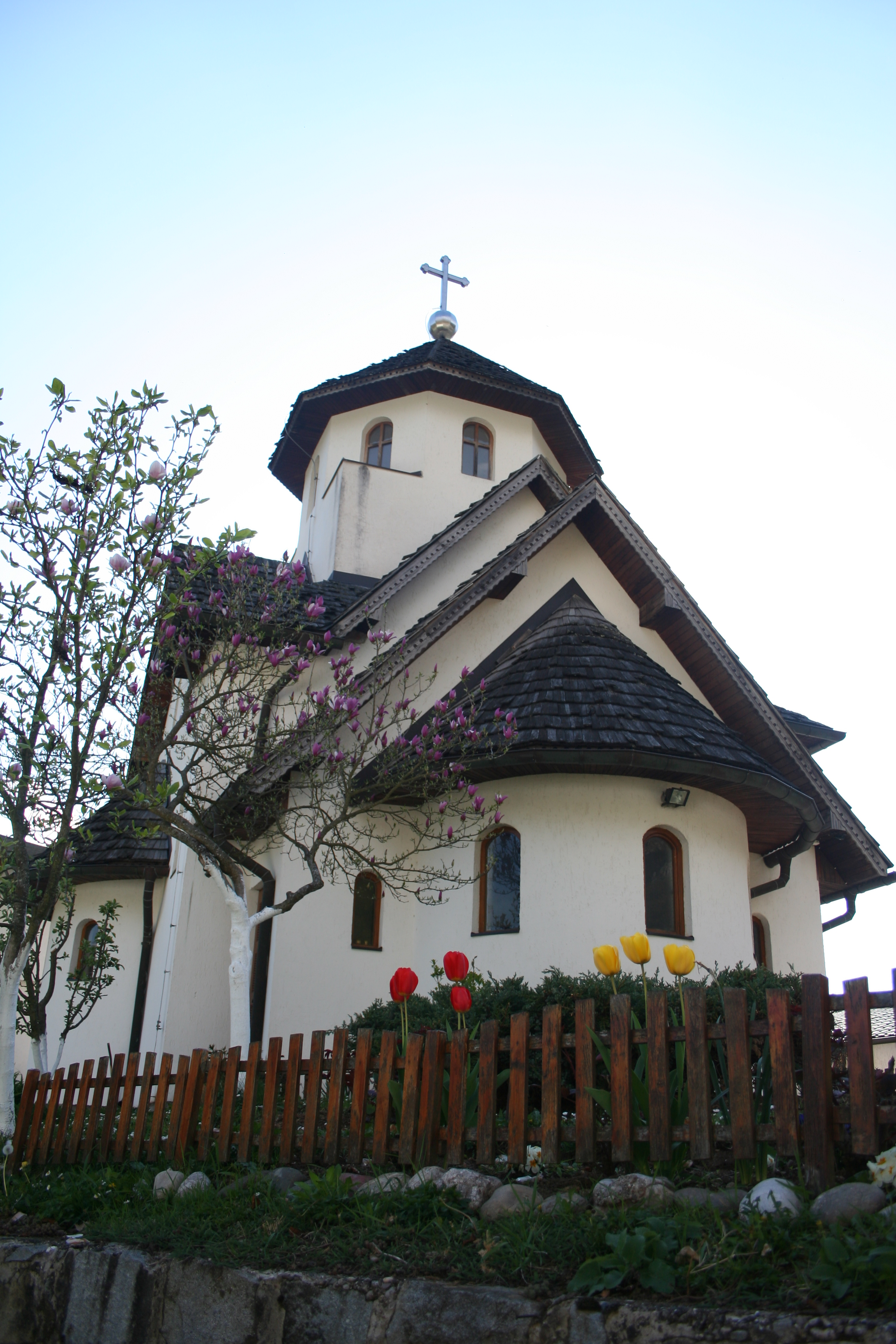
- Soko Monastery
- Denomination: Serbian Orthodox

Architecture
- Architectural type: Morava School
- Years built: 20th century

Soko Monastery (Serbian Cyrillic: Манастир Соко) is a Serbian Orthodox monastery at the foot of Soko Grad, on the slopes of Sokolska planina near Ljubovije, Serbia.

The monastery is dedicated to St. Nicholas of Myra, as well as to St. Bishop Nikolai Velimirović and every summer is the center of the international event "Moba" which brings together young people from the world and who originate from these areas.

The monastery was built by Bishop of Sabac-Valjevo Lavrentije and is dedicated to Bishop Nikolaj Lelicki and Zicko.

== Church of Monastery ==
The church of monastery has in the altar part of relics of St. Bishop Nikolaj. Was built in 1994 and belongs to the late Moravian style. The wood-carved iconostasis was made in the baroque style and gilded with 24-carat gold, while the icons in the Byzantine style frescoes were also donated to the monastery by sister Krstana Tasić, a famous icon painter.

The monastery itself has a boarding house with a spacious dining room, a museum and a workshop for monasticism. Bishop Nikolaj's House is located next to the monastery. It has a library, dining room, 32 bedrooms and other useful rooms.

== Cross and Way of Faith ==
Monastery of St. Nikolaj was built on the plateau below Soko grad or "Nevesta sultanove", the most hated fortress by the Ottomans, whose remains are still visible on one rock of Sokolska planina. On the same rock there is a gilded cross, 12 m high and weighing 2280 kg. The cross was placed 24 March 2000, as a monument to the innocent victims of the NATO criminal bombing in 1999, and a gift from the German Horst Wrobel.

The road, 2 km long, which leads from the monastery to the cross, is called the Way of Faith. On the way from the monastery to the cross, 10 chapels were built of stone, appropriately painted. One of God's commandments is written in each of them. There is a spring of healing water near the monastery. There is also a chapel of the Holy Father Nikolaj Mirlikijski in the monastery.

Monument to Bishop Nikolaj, 3 m high, is the work of Darinka Radovanović, a sculptor from Belgrade, and a gift from Branko Tupanjac, a Serb from Chicago.

In the monastery is the nun by Jovana, born Sibyl Lehr, granddaughter of Alexander Löhr.

== Gallery ==
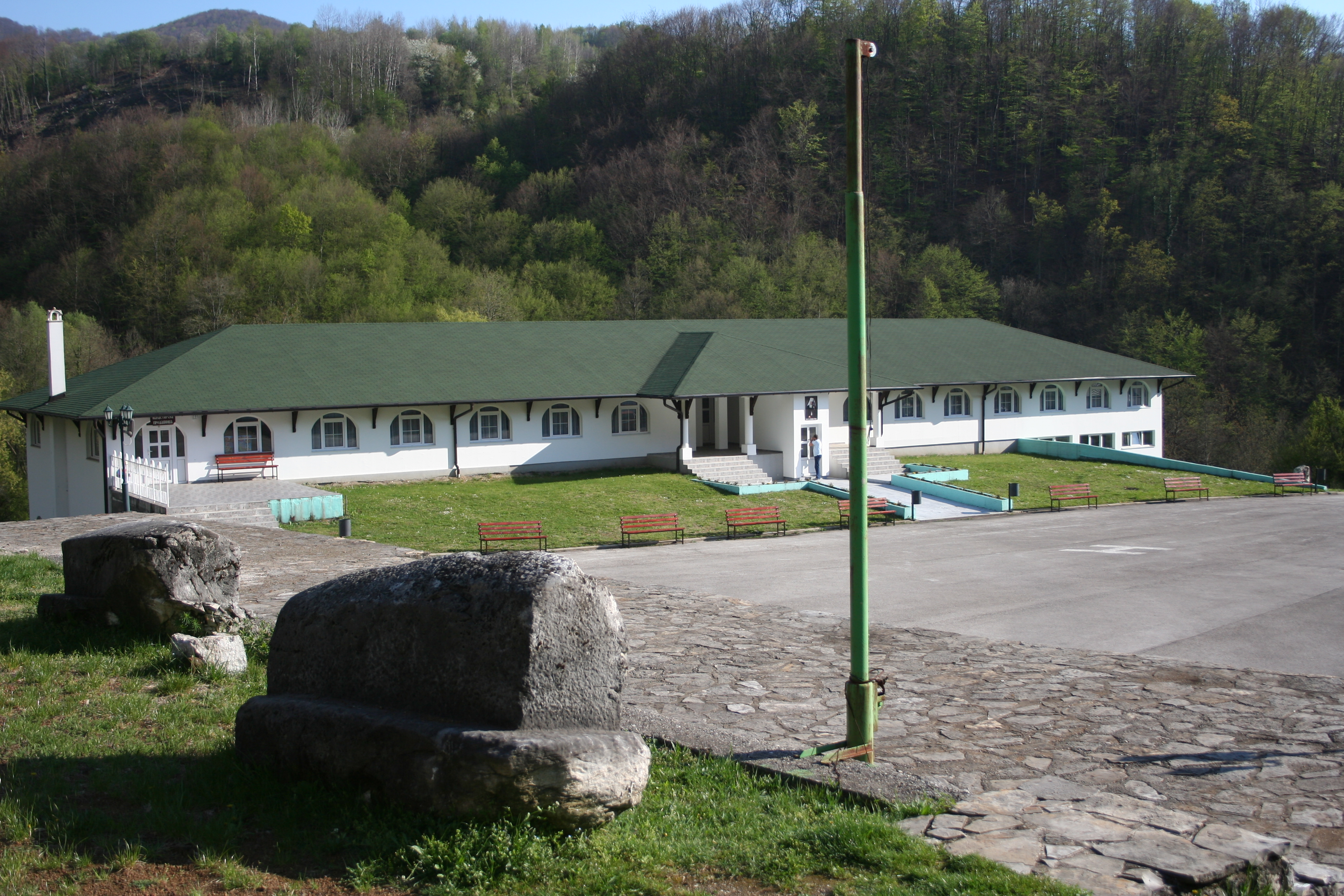

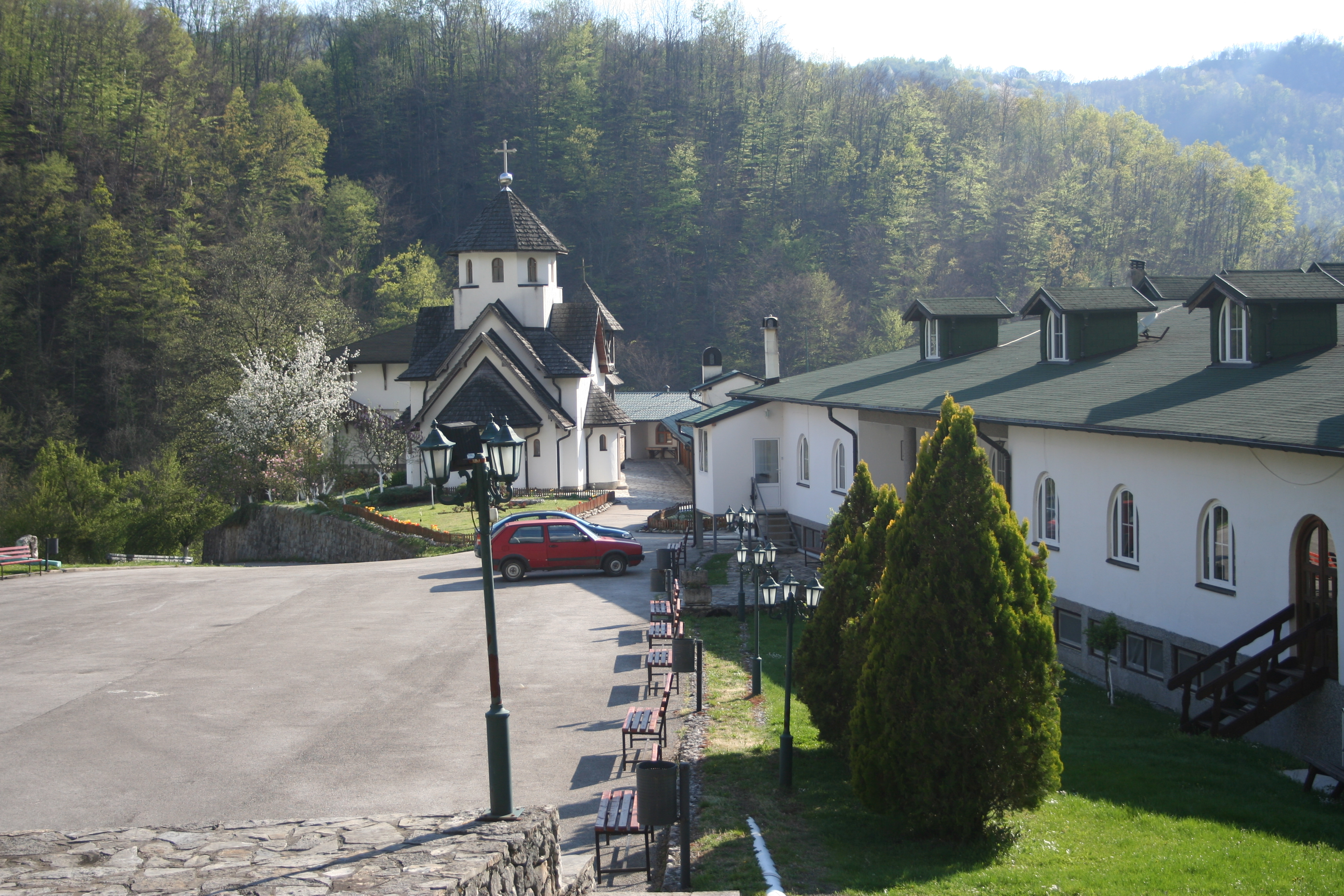

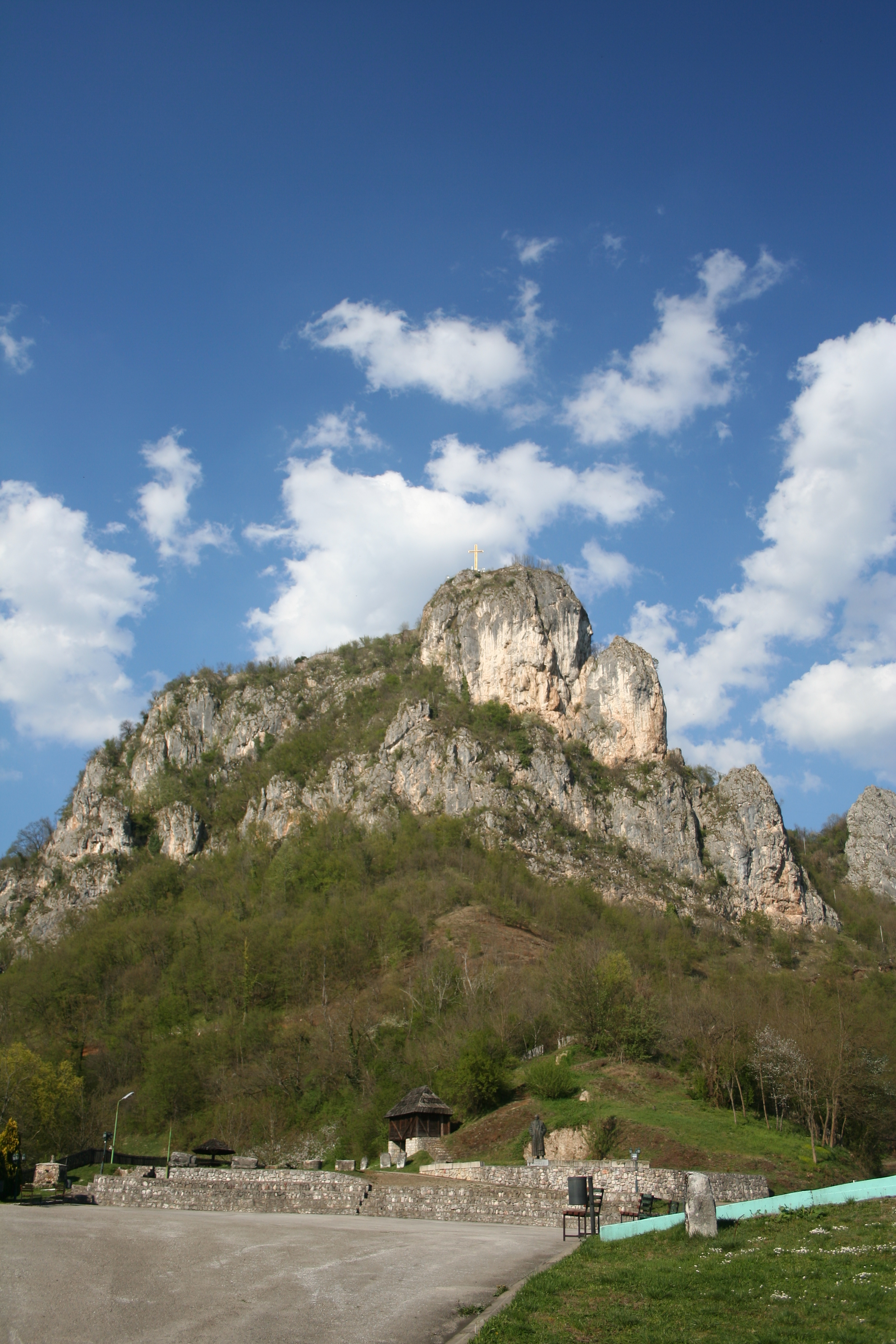

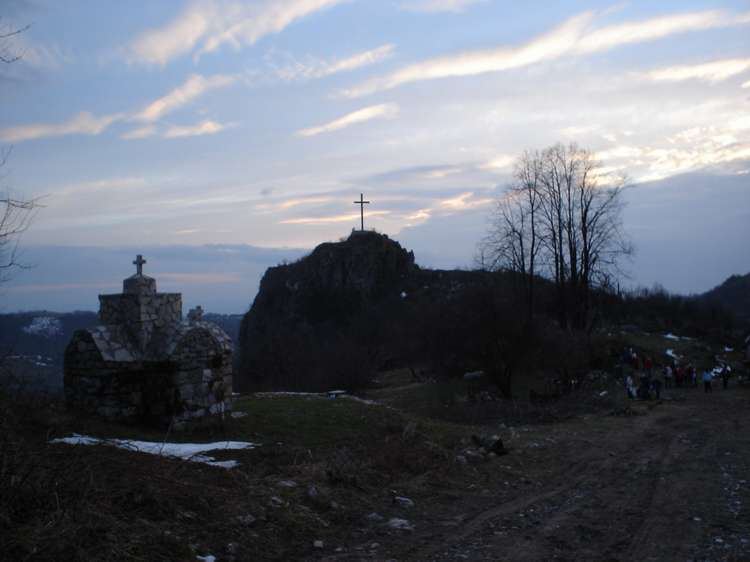
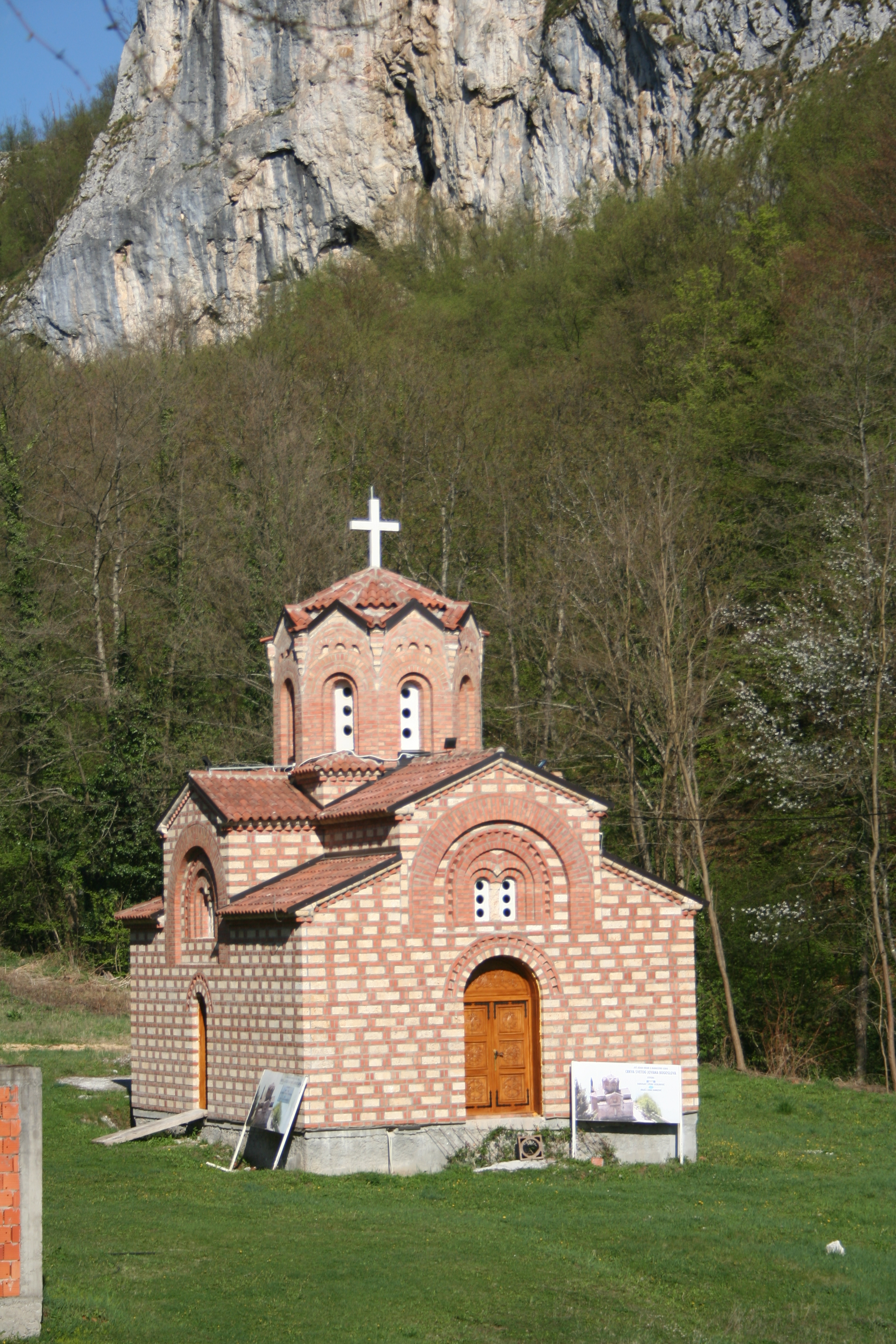

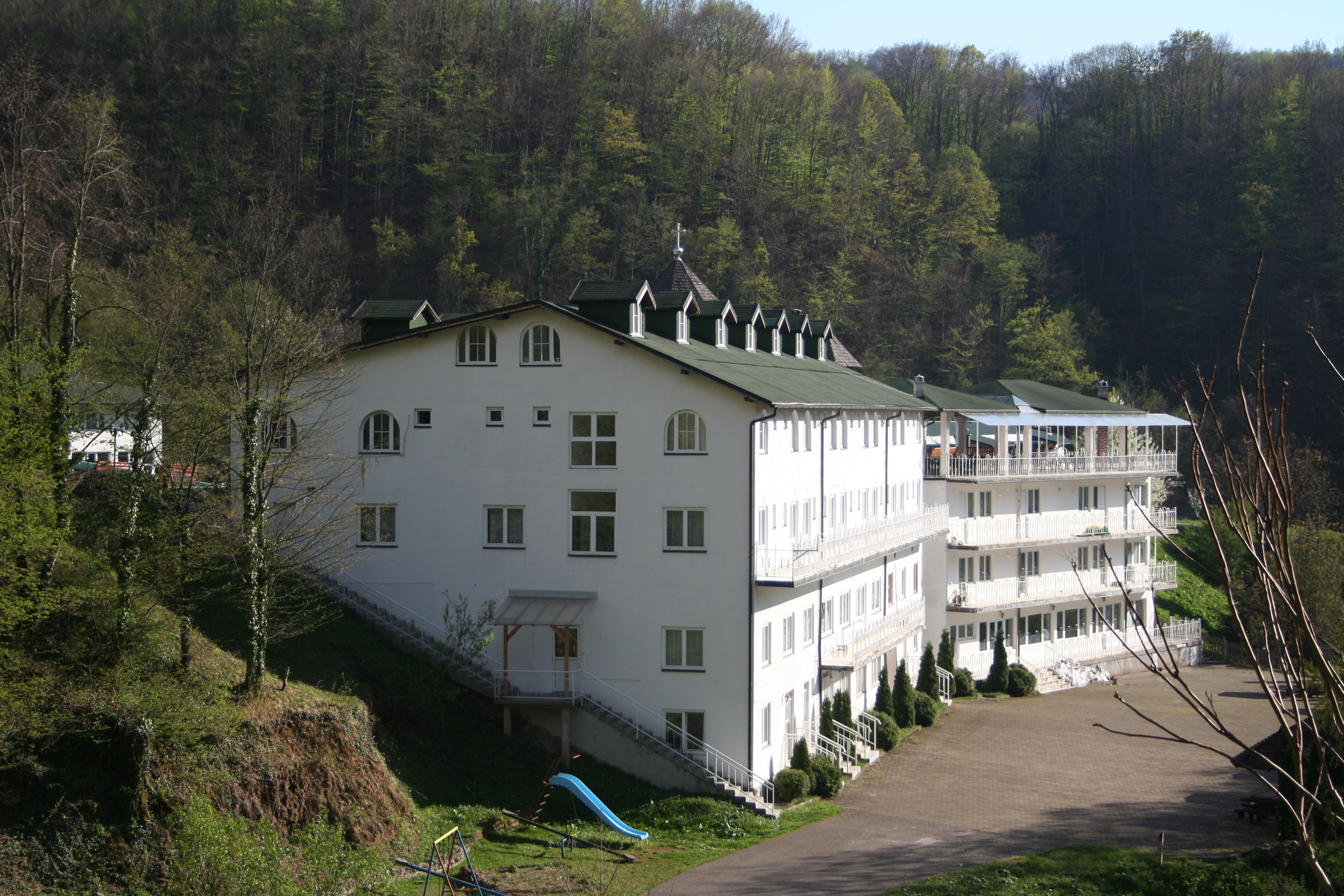

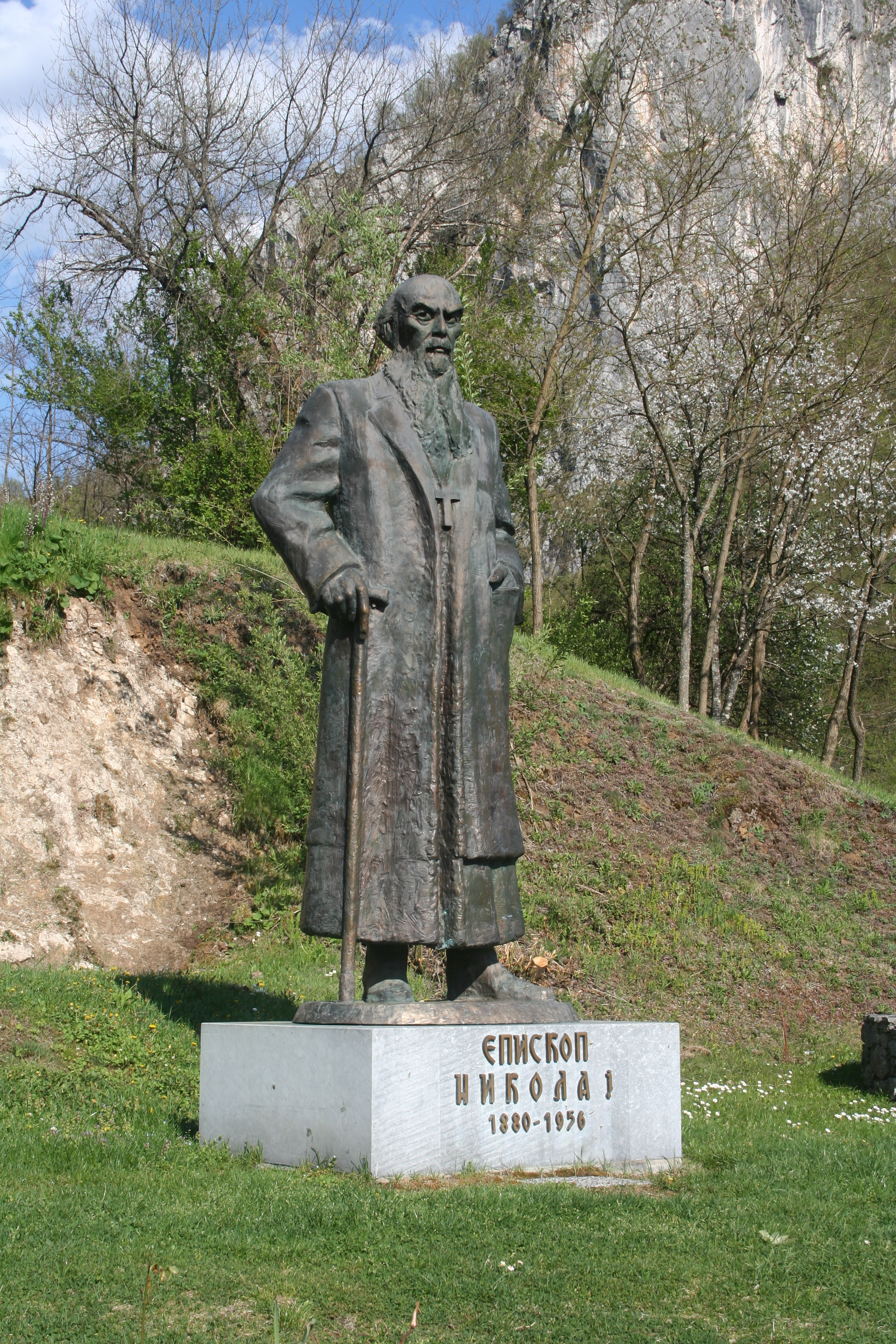

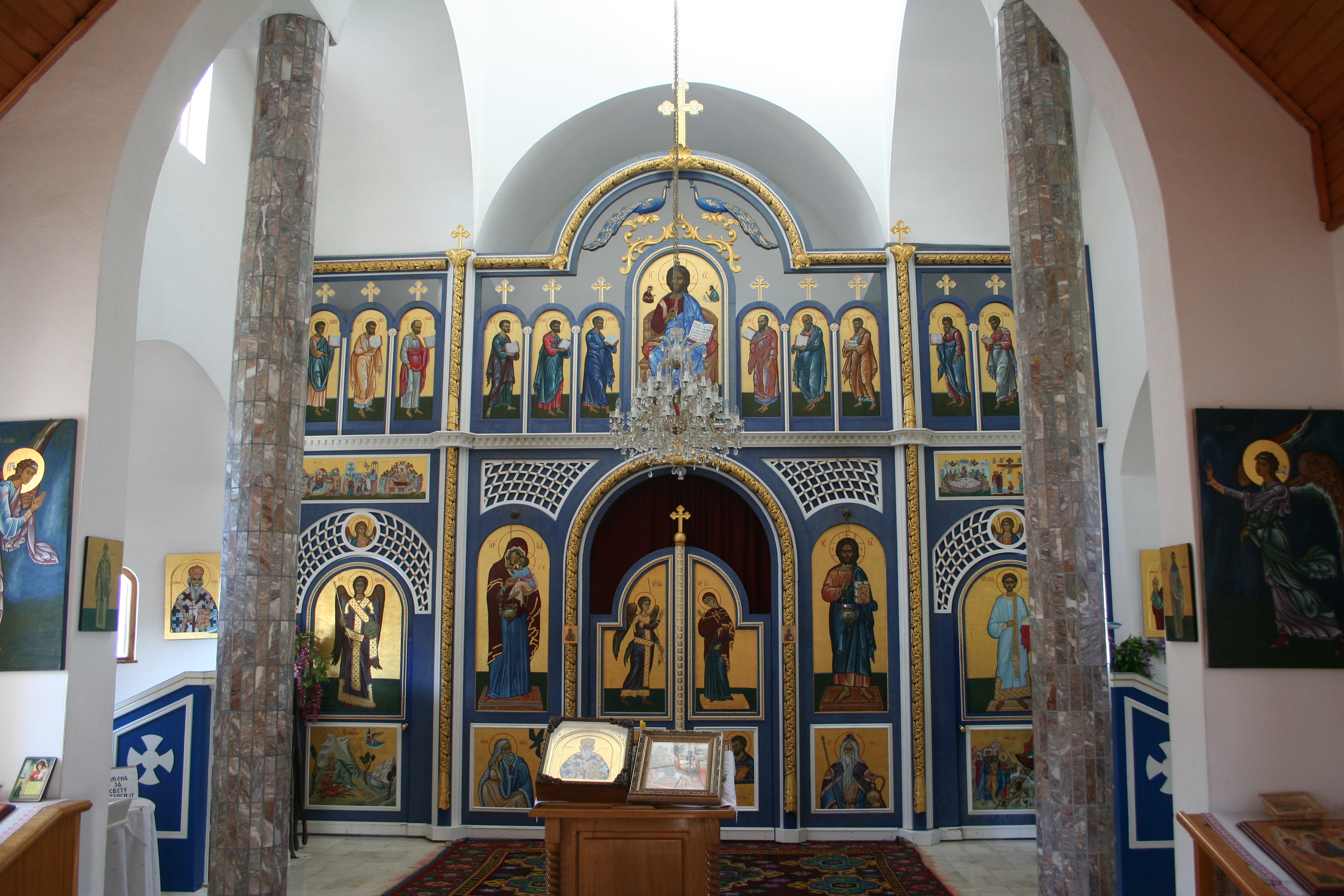
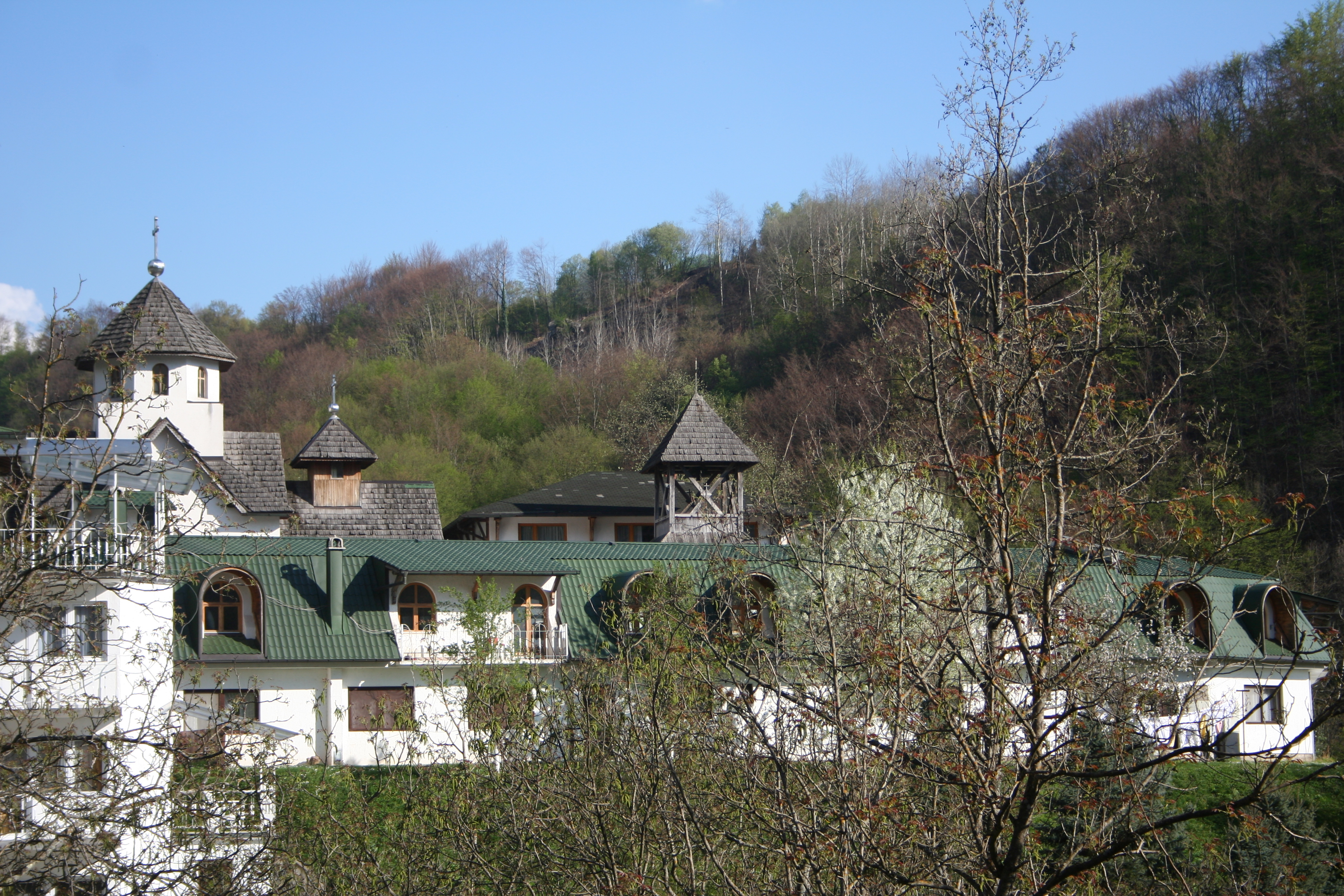

== See also ==
- List of Serbian Orthodox monasteries

== Sources ==
- Миливоје Васиљевић (2001), Соко - Град, Јанус; Rastko – via Rastko.rs
- Pavlović, Ljuba (2004). Соколска нахија. Sfairos. ISBN 86-7612-013-7 – via Google Docs.
