= Exodus of Muslims from Serbia =

Forced displacement in Serbia

- Part of Persecution of Muslims during the Ottoman decline
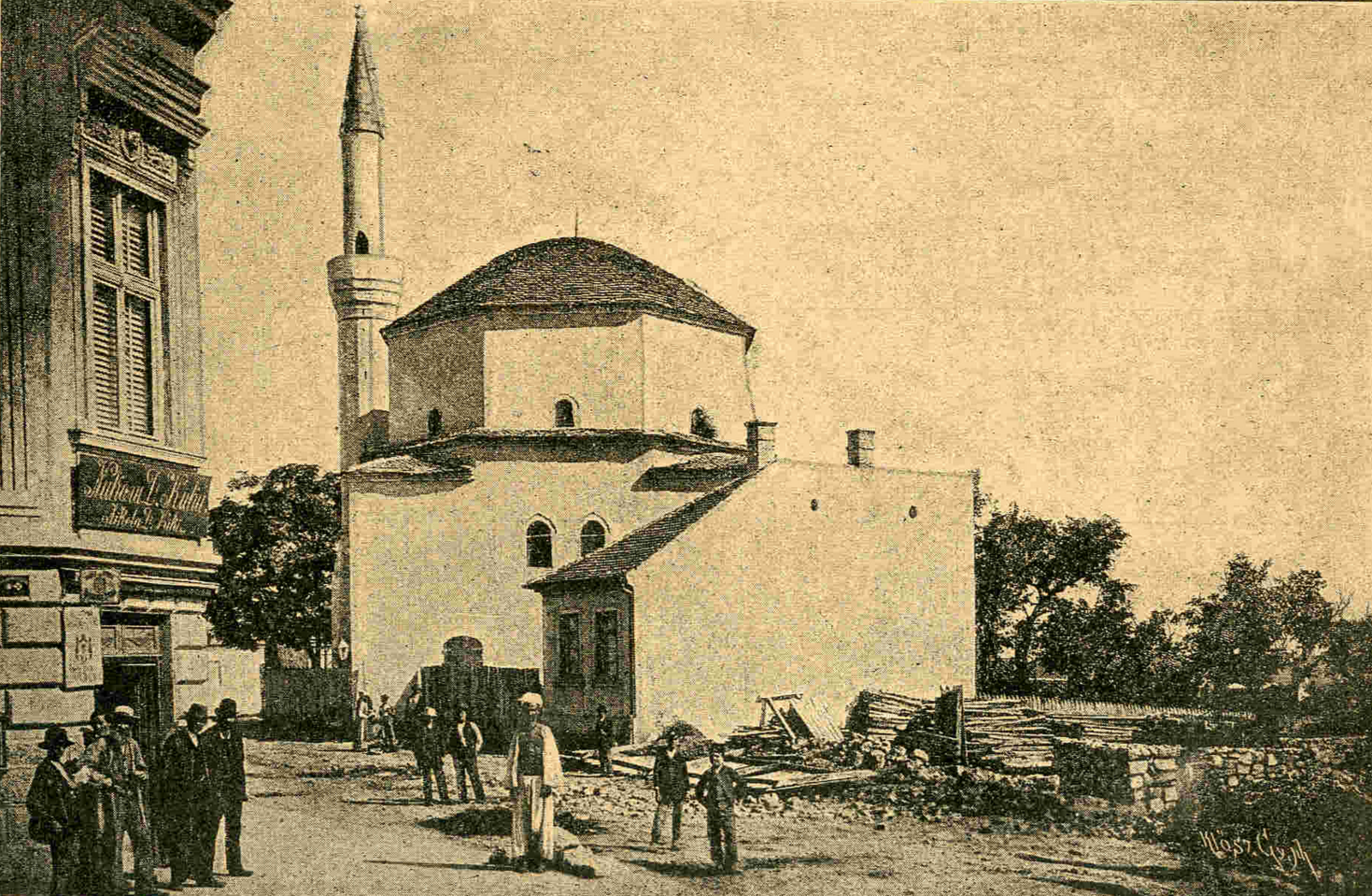
- Bajrakli Mosque, the only surviving Ottoman mosque in Belgrade
- Location: Belgrade, Smederevo, Šabac, Kladovo, Užice, Sokol (Principality of Serbia)
- Date: 1862
- Target: Muslims
- Attack type: Forced migration, ethnic cleansing
- Victims: 10,000 Muslims (mostly Albanians, Bosnian Muslims, Serb Muslims and Turks)
- Motive: Islamophobia, Serbianisation

In 1862, there was a forced migration of 10,000 Muslims from the Serbian cities of Belgrade, Soko, Užice, Šabac, Smederevo and Kladovo, all of them garrison towns. The reason for the forced migration was the Kanlıca Conference, according to which all Muslims living on the territory of the Principality of Serbia had to be evicted. Since the Romani people were exempt from this, some of the Muslims began to call themselves Roma, in order to stay in their hometowns. The majority of the refugees migrated to Bosnia, Vidin and Niš. The exodus changed not only the ethno-religious composition of the Principality of Serbia but also of the Ottoman Empire. The withdrawal of the Muslim civilian population also marked the final withdrawal of the Ottoman garrison from Serbia. Towards the beginning of the Great Eastern Crisis, the number of Muslims in the Serbian Principality had dropped to 6,000. Serbia had thus been almost entirely cleared of Muslims.

== Background ==
Before the First Serbian Uprising (1804–13) there were 40,000 Muslims in the territory of the Sanjak of Smederevo and Muslims made up the majority its towns.

Muslims in Belgrade represented c. 80% of its population. In Užice, over 96% of the population was Muslim, which is why it was sometimes called "Little Istanbul". In Sokol, another town affected by the exodus, there were 1,600 Muslims in total. A small proportion of the Muslim population carried arms. For example, in Sokol, the number of armed Muslims was 300.

The Muslims of Serbia were not an ethnic monolith, most of them were native speakers of South-Slavic, but there were Turkish-speaking or Albanian-speaking ones.

During the Serbian uprisings, some of the Muslims left their homes, but after 1815 a large part of them returned. With the Russo-Turkish War (1828–1829), the final decision was made for Serbia to be separated from the Ottoman Empire, which increased the territory of Serbia by granting it control over six more Ottoman nahiyas. This led to another wave of emigration, which the Ottoman government opposed, accusing Serbia of forced emigration of the Muslim population. In the end, the Sublime Porte agreed to accept the Muslim population but refused migration from the six newly annexed nahiyas. The second Hatsherif of 1830 regulated the Muslim problem in Serbia: only the Muslims living in the garrison towns (Belgrade, Šabac, Sokol, Užice, Kladovo, and Smederevo) had the right to hold Ottoman citizenship, while the others were to be designated as citizens of Serbia. With the third Hatsherif, Muslims were given the right to choose for up to 5 years - to be Serbian citizens or to leave Serbia and remain Ottoman citizens. While some Muslims left Serbia voluntarily, others opposed and did not recognize the third Hatsherif, which led to clashes with the Serbian military in towns such as Sokol, Užice, Ćuprija, Kruševac, and Aleksinac.

== Reasons ==
Although Serbia pursued a state policy of expelling the Muslim minority, the Ottoman Empire and some of the affected Muslims were not entirely opposed to the policy themselves, largely due to the fact that in Islam, Muslims should not live in a non-Muslim country. There was a political reason as well; the empire wanted as many Muslims to live in its territory as possible. Furthermore, international diplomacy also played a role. As such, in the same 1830 decree which recognized Serbia as an autonomous principality, the Ottoman sultan Mahmud II also ordered the eviction of Muslim civilians from six Serbian towns.

In 1862, Ottoman-Serbian tensions were sparked following a confrontation between Ottoman police and a Serb at a fountain, which led to the death of the latter. It soon turned into an ethnic clash as parts of Belgrade were bombed by the Ottoman garrison, causing damage to the city. Because of these events, the Great Powers requested the Ottoman Empire to organize a peace conference. The conference lasted from late July to September 4, when the sides signed a document titled A Protocol On The Question of Serbia which was signed in Constantinopole. The question of the Muslims living in Serbia was not a primary topic. However, at least three of the twelve articles in the protocol dealt indirectly with the issue. The conclusion was that Muslims living in towns they held following the signing of the Treaty of Paris (1856) were to be expelled and control of the towns would be handed over to the Serbian authorities. In turn, the Muslims would be compensated financially. The expulsion was accepted by the Ottoman side in September and the Serbian side in October.

On 8 September, a fire broke out in Užice. The causes and perpetrator were unknown: the Serbs blamed the Muslims on the basis of them not allowing the Serbs to put out the fire. Muslims, however, prevented Serbs from entering the town as they worried they would be robbed during the firefight as had happened earlier in Belgrade. This fire destroyed a large part of the city, including a mosque, a türbe, 124 Muslim shops, over 100 Muslim houses and 63 Serbian houses. The number of destroyed buildings was 88.

== The exodus ==
=== Belgrade ===
The migration of Muslims from Belgrade took place in several waves: the first wave of 1,802 people arrived in Lom in October 1862, and then they settled in different cities. Of these, 350 were accommodated in Pirot, and 1,502 in Niš. The second group left Belgrade at the end of October and numbered 550 people who settled in Vidin. The last group migrated on October 2, 1862, and a large part of them (600 people) settled later in Niš, 300 people in Brčko, and a small part went to Vidin. In this way, the Muslim presence in Belgrade was put to an end. Most of the Belgrade Muslims chose to live in Niš, and their number was around 2,100.

The last group left the city with Ali Rıza Pasha, and the sending off of the citizens became an official ceremony with farewell marches being played. When the ship left Belgrade with Ali Rıza Paşa and the Muslims, the Serbian cannons fired a farewell shot. After the exodus, most of the Islamic sites in the city were destroyed.

The Serbian writer Branislav Nušić mentions the exodus of Belgrade's Muslims in his work The Sixth of April, in which the Serbs were enthusiastic about entering the city, and that people would have a feast there on St. George's Day.

=== Kladovo ===
Muslims from Kladovo (Fethülislam) took refuge in Vidin in 1865 when 58 families (270 people) left Kladovo. Since the Kladovo Muslims were poor, part of the donations made to the Muslims from Belgrade and Smederevo were given to them.

=== Šabac ===
The Muslims of Šabac (Böğürdelen) preferred Bosnia and 568 families were settled there. Just like the other refugees, they too were given new clothes and 25 guruş each before they migrated.

=== Smederevo ===
The Muslims left Smederevo (Semendire) on October 4, 1862 and settled in Vidin. Their number was 500, a total of 150 families. They were taken under the supervision of soldiers from Nis and Vidin. New houses were also built for them in Vidin.

=== Užice ===
Because of the fire, the houses of the Muslims in Užice quickly began to be offered for sale. Since most of the Muslims from Užice were rich, the sale of properties and fields continued until 1867. They left the city in September 1862 with everything that survived the fire. Užice Muslims also migrated in three waves. Their total number was 3,834, of which 917 were children. Almost all of them left for Bosnia, but a small unknown number settled in Albania and Macedonia.

=== Sokol ===
The Muslims from Sokol left Serbia on October 28, 1862. A large part of them initially resisted but then migrated to Eastern and Northeastern Bosnia.

== Accommodation ==
=== Sanjak of İzvornik ===
A large part of the Muslims decided to live in İzvornik. About 7,000 refugees (1,300 households) were in the sanjak and the governor took care of their accommodation. Between 40 and 100 acres of land were given to each household. New settlements were created for refugees: Kozluk, Brezovo Polje, Gorna Azizija (modern Bosanski Šamac) and Dolna Azizija (modern Orašje). The new settlements had a checkerboard layout.

In Kozluk 120 houses were built for the Muslims from Sokol. In Brezovo Polje, 350 houses were built for the refugees from Užice and Šabac, in Dolna Azizija, 200 houses were built for those who came from Belgrade, Užice and Šabac. In Gorna Azizija, 250 houses were built for the Muslims from Užice and Sokol.

They maintained a local identity and even after 100 years still refer to themselves as Užičani (those from Užice), Šapčani (those from Šabac), Sokoljani (those from Sokol) and Beograđani (those from Belgrade)

In Sanjak of İzvornik, before 1862, Christians (Catholics and Orthodox) were the majority (over 50%), and Muslims were the minority (44%). The settlement of 7,000 Bosnian Muslims and the departure of the Orthodox for Serbia changed the demographic composition of the sanjak and Muslims became the majority.

=== Sanjak of Niš ===
A large number of Belgrade's Muslims settled in Niš, totalling 2,100. During their journey, their food was provided by the local Muslims. In Salonica, Drama and Serres, 100,000 guruş were donated to the refugees. The Muslims in Sofia collected 5,000 guruş and the Christians 1,500 guruş, for donation to the Belgrade Muslims settling in Niš. In Salonica, Filibe, Silistra and Sofia, apart from money, clothes were also collected. The rich people of Niš took the Muslim refugees into their houses and the wealthier ones housed several refugees. Most were given temporary shelter in empty buildings, such as unoccupied houses and unused schools.

Ahmed Midhat Pasha dealt with the needs of the Muslims resettling in Niš. By his order, new houses, inns and madrasahs were built in the city. The disused "Fethiye Mosque" of Niš (often called kilise cami 'the church mosque', as it had been the church of St Nicholas until 1737), was renovated to serve as the centre of the new refugee quarter being constructed. Within a year, forty-four new houses and two fountains were built. Funds for a further sixty houses were provided for those still lacking permanent homes by that time.

New houses were also being built in Vidin for Belgrade's Muslims. A total of 169 houses were built for Belgrade and Smederevo Muslims.

=== Elsewhere ===
In the same period, there was a slight percentage increase of the Muslim population in the Sanjak of Novi Pazar.

== Property issue ==
A commission was set up to assess the properties and fields left behind by the Muslims. The commission included persons from the Principality of Serbia and the Ottoman Empire. Ali Bey and Miralay Mehmed Bey from the Ottoman side and Dimitrie Cernborac and Gaya Jeremic from the Serbian side participated in the commission responsible for the properties of the Belgrade Muslims. The Commission held its first meeting in Belgrade on 21 September 1863, at Mehmed Ali Bey's house. Although Ali and Mehmed Ali Bey proposed to establish a mixed committee of experts to conclude the compensation issue in the commission meetings, the Serbian representatives did not accept this and intended to put the provisions of the Kanlıca Conference at the command of the Serbian knez.

There was also a big difference between the two sides' estimates regarding property values; while the property owners demanded 36,000 purses (18 million guruş), the Serbs offered 6,000 purses (3-million guruş). As a result of the discussions, the Ottoman commissars decreased their estimate to 18,000 purses (9 million guruş), while the Serbians increased their own to 12,000 purses (6 million guruş). However, both sides were unable to reach a solution and Ali Bey decided to return to Istanbul; for this reason, the Serbian side raised their figure to 15,000 purses (7.5 million guruş). The Ottoman side decided to add another 8 million guruş (16,000 purses) from its own treasury, insisting that the Serbian side return them within half a year. It was decided that the compensation would be paid out within three years. This decision was taken in 1865, December 5.

== Destruction of Islamic heritage ==
By 1868, 34 mosques were destroyed in Belgrade, and 24 in Smederevo. А total of 270–300 mosques were destroyed. Only the Bajrakli Mosque in Belgrade survived.

== See also ==
- Albanian expulsion in 1830–1876
- Albanian expulsion in 1877–1878
- Persecution of Ottoman Muslims
- Exodus of Turks from Bulgaria in 1950–1951

== Sources ==
- Djokić, Dejan (2023). A Concise History of Serbia. Cambridge University Press. p. 280. ISBN 9781009308656.
- Karčić, Hikmet (2018). "Posljedni muslimani u Beogradu 1867". Takvim Za 2018. Sarajevo: El-Kalem: 162–169.
- Krpić, Amir (2020). "The 1862 Kanlica Conference and Demographic Changes in Northeast Bosnia in the 1860s" (PDF). Prague Papers on the History of International Relations (2). Charles University in Prague: 27–42.
- Özkan, Ayşe (2011). "The Expulsion of Muslims from Serbia after the International Conference in Kanlıca and Withdrawal of the Ottoman Empire from Serbia (1862–1867)". Akademik Bakış. 5 (9).
- Popek, Krzysztof (2019). "Muslim Emigration from the Balkan Peninsula in the 19th century: A Historical Outline". Prace Historyczne. 146 (3): 517–533. doi:10.4467/20844069PH.19.029.10383.
- Popek, Krzysztof (2021). "The Muslim Exodus and The Emergence of the modern Serbian state in the first half of the 19th century". Prace Historyczne. 148 (2): 301–314. doi:10.4467/20844069PH.21.023.13860.
- Riedler, Florian (2018). "Communal Boundaries and Confessional Policies in Ottoman Niš". Journal of the Economic and Social History of the Orient. 61 (4): 726–756. doi:10.1163/15685209-12341459. ISSN 0022-4995. JSTOR 26572320.
