= Ramiz Sadiku =

Kosovo Albanian anti-fascist

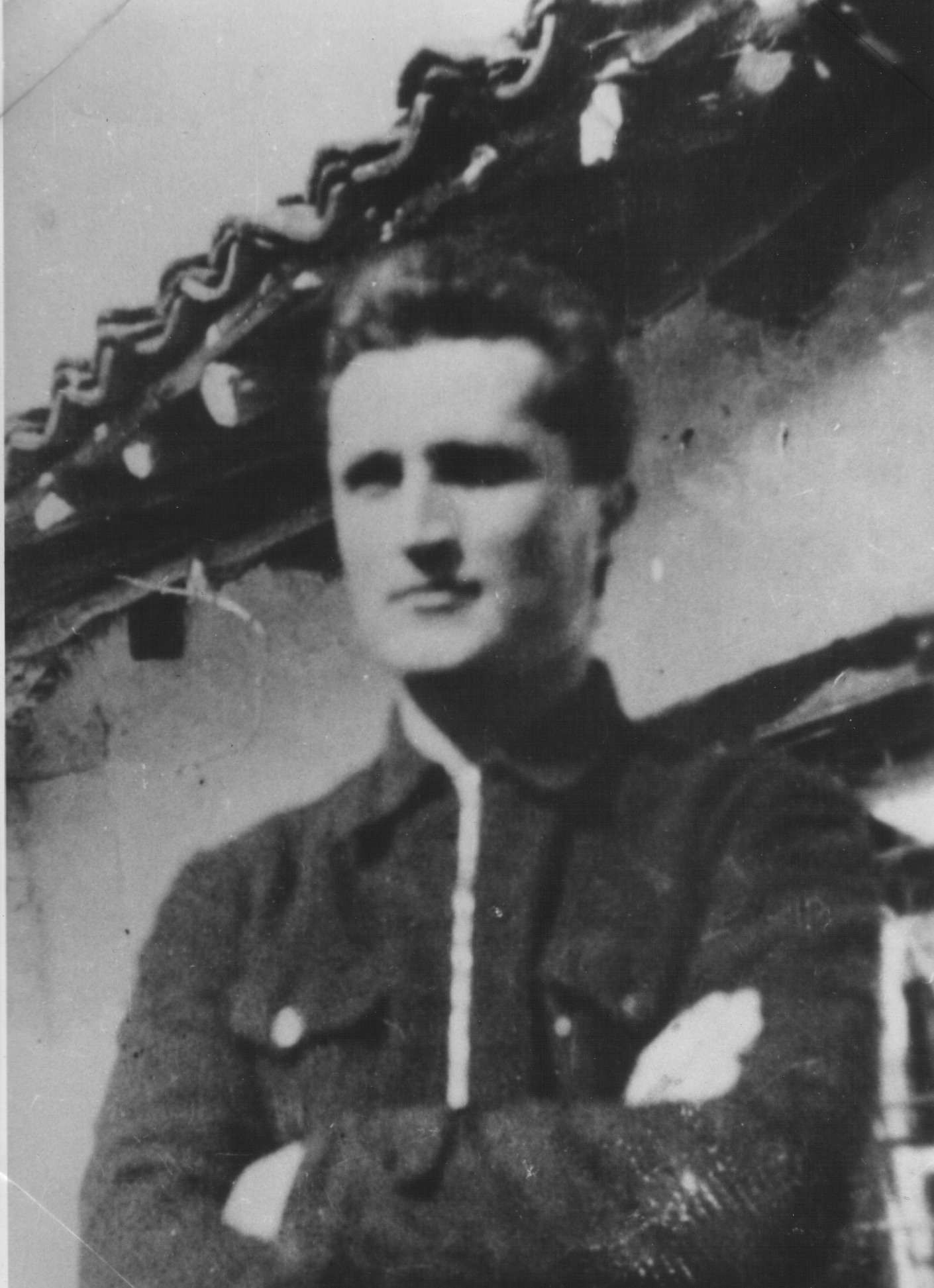
- Born: 19 January 1915; Peć, Kingdom of Montenegro (now Peja, Kosovo)
- Died: 10 April 1943 (aged 28); Prizren, Albanian-occupied Yugoslavia (now Prizren, Kosovo)
- Military career
- Allegiance: Yugoslav Partisans
- Branch: General HQ
- Service years: 1941–43
- Conflicts: World War II in Yugoslavia
- Awards: Order of the People's Hero

Ramiz Sadiku ( Albanian pronunciation: [ɾaˈmiz saˈdiku]; Serbian: Рамиз Садику; 19 January 1915 – 10 April 1943) was an Albanian law student and one of the organizers of the anti-fascist uprising in Kosovo.

He was posthumously awarded the Order of the People's Hero.

== Early life ==
Sadiku was born in 1915 in Peć/Pejë into an ethnic Albanian family. He completed elementary and high school in the city and then enrolled in the University of Belgrade Faculty of Law.

Even as a student in the Peć high school, he was a member of the Revolutionary Youth Organization. In 1931, he was one of the co-founders of a sports club named Future in which revolutionary youth gathered. Since the club was quickly shut down, Ramiz was arrested and spent time in prison. He became a member of the League of Communist Youth of Yugoslavia (SKOJ) in 1933 and a member of the Communist Party of Yugoslavia (KPJ) in 1936. Soon thereafter he became a bureau member of the KPJ District Committee for Kosovo and Metohija.

== Pre-Second World War ==
In 1938, Sadiku requested to Kosovo students, SKOJ members and other SKJ District Committee for Kosovo members that they publish a decree demanding the "national equality of Albanians." This decree to the government of the Kingdom of Yugoslavia demanded that the "emigration of Albanians be stopped and that their property stops being seized." Ramiz and 68 other Communists took part in writing this decree and the decree made widespread headlines (it was also sent to the League of Nations in Geneva.

== Second World War ==
In 1939, Albania was occupied by Italy. The KPJ District Committee for Kosovo and Metohija organized gatherings in the region that tried to explain the political reasons why Albania has been occupied by fascist soldiers. They also published pamphlets in the Albanian language. The police in Peć got hold of ten of these pamphlets and organized widespread arrests and Sadiku was one of the people arrested. Sadiku spent two months in the infamous Šerehmet kula in Peć and was then transferred to the prison on Ada Ciganlija. He was later returned to Peć where a trial began. The prosecutor sought a death sentence but since Sadiku's guilt could not be proven, he was freed. Immediately afterwards, Sadiku had to stop attending law school (in his third year) and join the army.

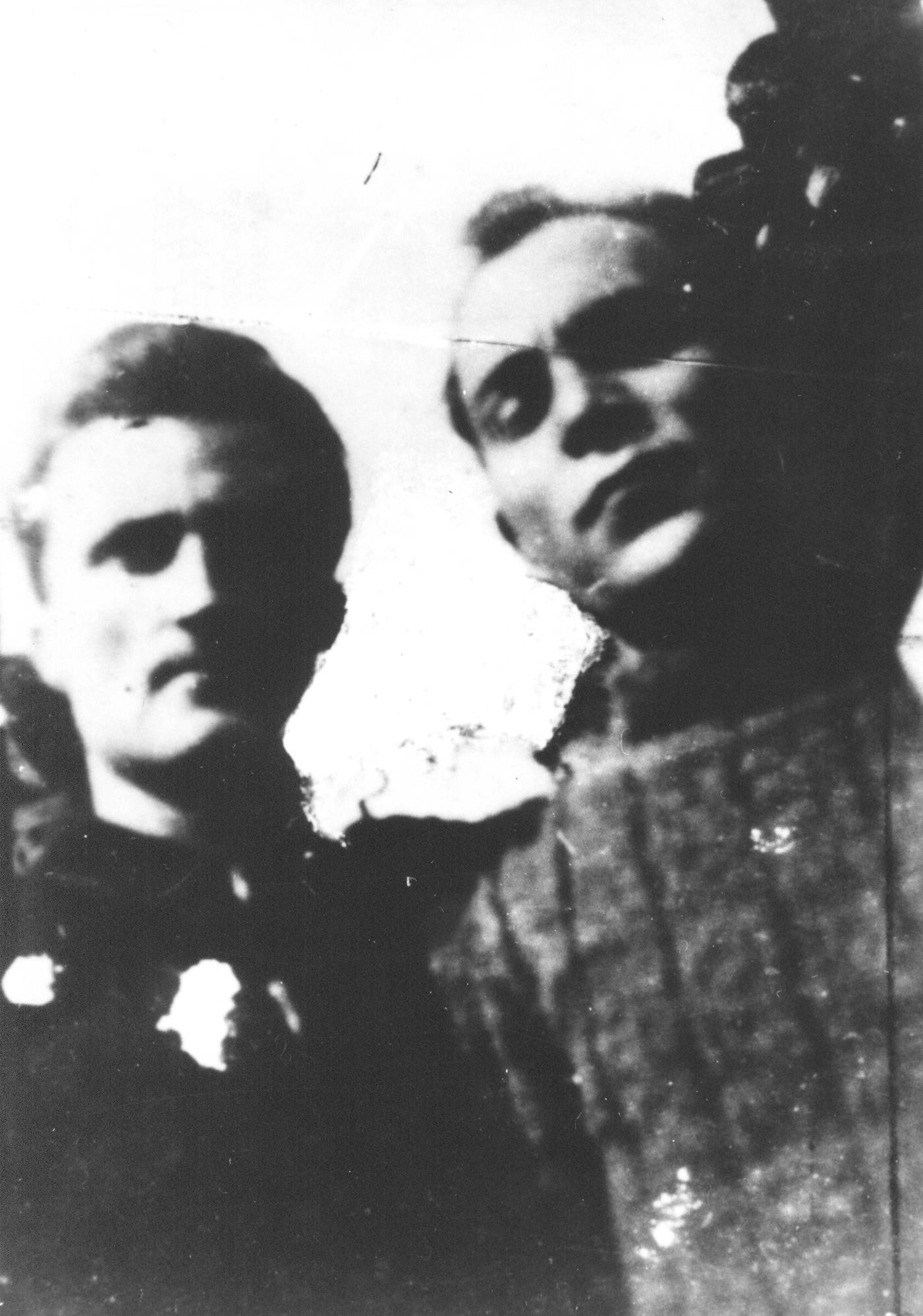
Sadiku and Boro Vukmirović in 1943

When the Invasion of Yugoslavia occurred in 1941, Sadiku was serving his army time in the 42nd Infantry Regiment in Bjelovar. After severe battles that his battalion had in Daruvar with the Germans, Sadiku was captured and taken to the city assembly camp. With the help of the local Bjelovar communists, Sadiku managed to escape from prison and return to Peć. Upon returning to his birth city, Ramiz had to live as an illegal in fear of being recognized as a known Communist and being arrested by the Italian police. Although being in hiding, he still actively worked in the bureau of the KPJ District Committee for the region. At the beginning of the occupation, Sadiku had to practically work alone in leading the District Committee as many of the organizers had transferred to Montenegro.

In July 1942, Sadiku was arrested at a party meeting in Peć and again was led to the Šerehmet kula prison. Even after being tortured, Sadiku didn't give up any party secrets and was transferred to the prison in Tirana in September of that same year. With help from Albanian communists, he managed to escape from the prison and illegally return to Kosovo.

In April 1943, Sadiku was in Đakovica/Gjakova along with Boro Vukmirović. At that time CK KPJ member Tempo Vukmanović left for Prizren. Ramiz and Boro had agreed to meet him there. On April 7, 1943 en route to Prizren in the village of Landovica, Ramiz and Boro were captured after being wounded in battles with Italian fascists and Albanian fascists known as the Balli Kombëtar. Knowing that they are high-ranking members of the Yugoslav Partisans, the Balli Kombëtar members tried to get information on other Partisans from them by torturing them. As Vukmirović and Sadiku didn't want to inform, it was decided that they were to be executed. On being demanded that they are to be executed individually, they put their arms around one another and shouted slogans supporting the Partisan cause and were executed together (on April 10, 1943).

== Legacy ==
On March 6, 1945 by decree of the presidency of the Anti-Fascist Council for the National Liberation of Yugoslavia, Sadiku and Vukmirović were posthumously awarded the Order of the People's Hero and were among the first to be recipients.

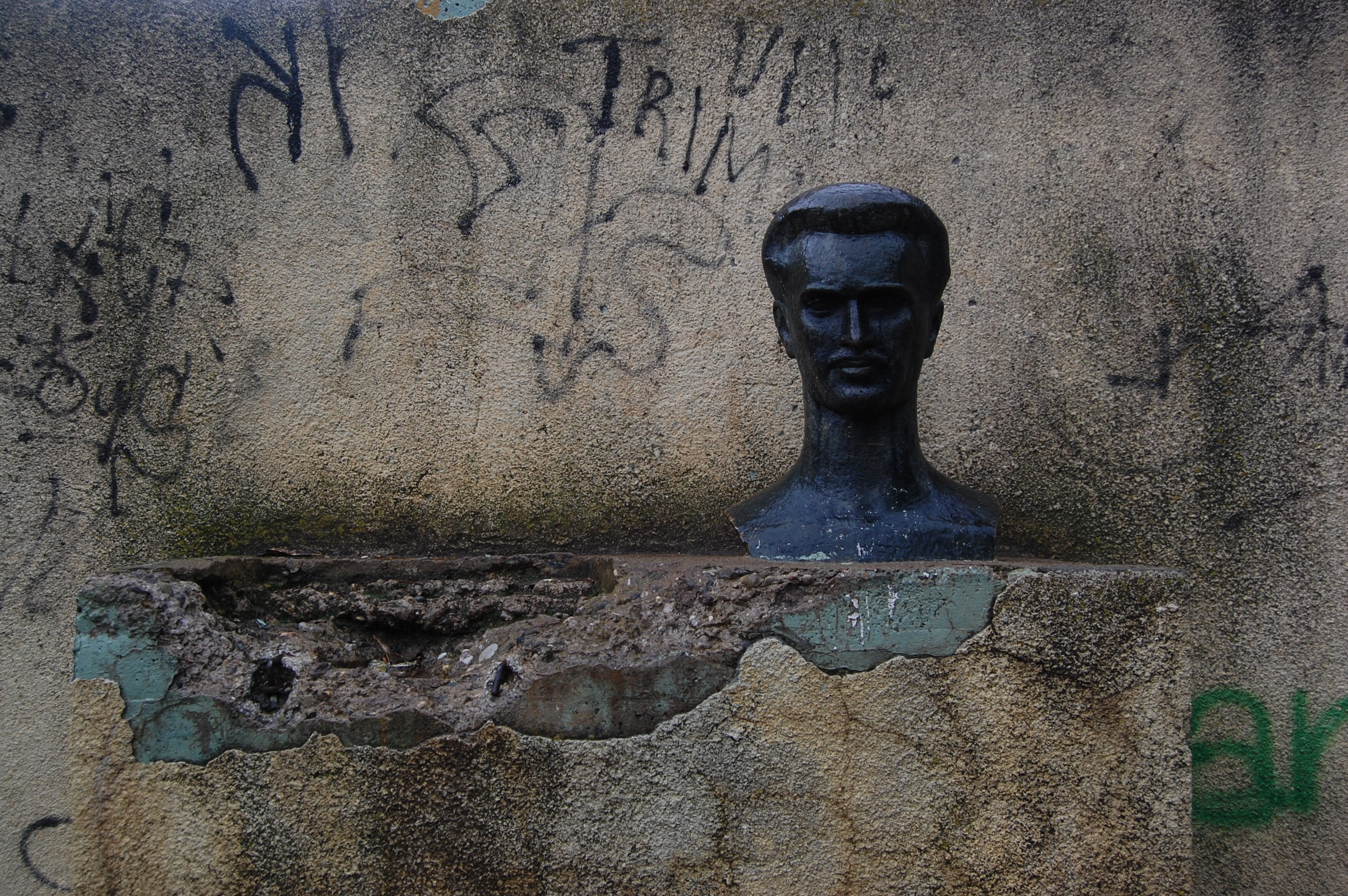
A bust of Sadiku at the City Park in Pristina. To the right of it stood the bust of Vukmirović until it was broken/removed by local Albanians in 1999.

On September 9, 1945 by decree of the presidency of the Anti-Fascist Council for the National Liberation of Albania (as recommended by the commander-in-chief of the Albanian armed forces Enver Hoxha), he was posthumously awarded the Hero of Albania.

In the years after the Second World War, Boro and Ramiz became a symbol of Brotherhood and Unity of the Serbian/Montenegrin and Albanian people and of the anti-fascist struggle in Kosovo and Metohija. Numerous streets and schools bore their name along with the sports centre in Priština. The football club KF Ramiz Sadiku is named after Sadiku.

In 1963 on the twenty-year anniversary of their execution, a monument was made in the form of an obelisk with a mosaic and a memorial fountain and it was erected in Landovica in the spot they were executed. Poet Adem Gajtani dedicated the poem Boro dhe Ramiz to them.

A Končar-class missile boat of the Yugoslav Navy, RTOP 403 was named Ramiz Sadiku.

== See also ==
- Boro Vukmirović
