= Kraljevići =

- Village
- Location within Bosnia and Herzegovina
- Coordinates: 44.493352°N 18.9887604°E
- Country: Bosnia and Herzegovina
- Entity: Federation of Bosnia and Herzegovina
- Canton: Tuzla
- Municipality: Sapna

Area
  - Total: 3.18 sq mi (8.24 km^{2})

Population (2013)
  - Total: 1,471
  - Density: 462/sq mi (179/km^{2})

Kraljevići is a village in the municipality of Sapna, Bosnia and Herzegovina.

== Demographics ==
According to the 2013 census, its population was 1,471.

Ethnicity in 2013
Ethnicity	Number	Percentage
Bosniaks	1,419	96.5%
Serbs	5	0.3%
Croats	1	0.1%
other/undeclared	46	3.1%
Total	1,471	100%
