= Boro Vukmirović =

Yugoslav partisan (1912–1943)

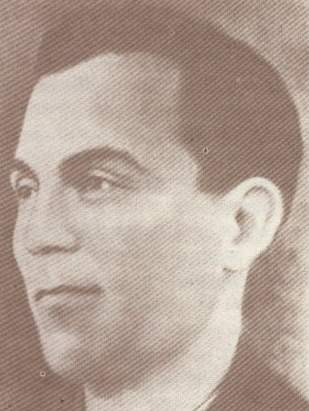
- Born: Borko Vukmirović; 1 August 1912; Bratsigovo, Kingdom of Bulgaria
- Died: 10 April 1943 (aged 30); Prizren, Albanian Kingdom
- Military career
- Allegiance: Yugoslav Partisans
- Branch: General HQ
- Service years: 1941–43
- Nickname: Crni
- Conflicts: World War II in Yugoslavia
- Awards: Order of the People's Hero

Borko "Boro" Vukmirović (Serbian Cyrillic: Борко "Боро" Вукмировић, IPA: [bǒːr(k)o vukmǐːrovitɕ]; 1 August 1912 – 10 April 1943) was one of the organizers of the anti-fascist uprising in Kosovo.

He was posthumously awarded the Order of the People's Hero.

== Early life ==
Vukmirović was born on 1 August 1912 in the Bulgarian town of Bratsigovo. His father Nikola Vukmirović, originally from the Montenegrin town of Rijeka Crnojevića, took part in the Ilinden Uprising in 1903. After the uprising was suppressed, Nikola was imprisoned in the Ottoman Empire later moving to Bulgaria where he married Stojanka with whom he had three sons: Boro, Andro and Rade. In 1914, the family moved to Peć where Boro completed elementary school and six grades of gymnasium. At that time, the Peć gymnasium had only six grades and further education had to be completed in Prizren for which his parents didn't have the funds. After completing the sixth grade, he found a job as a labour worker. He worked in Peć and other places in Kosovo.

== Pre-Second World War ==
As a young worker, he joined the labour movement. He became a member of the League of Communist Youth of Yugoslavia (SKOJ) in 1932 and a member of the League of Communists of Yugoslavia (KPJ) in 1933. Near the end of 1934, he became a bureau member of the Communist Party District Committee for Peć.

Due to his revolutionary activities, he was sought and arrested numerous times by the police. In 1935, he was arrested and tortured in a police prison in Peć. He was then brought before the state court in Belgrade but due to a lack of evidence he was freed. At the first regional KPJ conference for Kosovo and Metohija at the beginning of July 1937, he was chosen as the organizational secretary for the Regional Committee. At the beginning of August 1940, he was chosen as a member of the KPJ Regional Committees for Montenegro, Sandžak and Kosovo and Metohija. In October 1940, Vukmirović was in Zagreb for the Fifth Worldwide KPJ Conference at which he was a candidate for member of the Central Committee of the League of Communists of Yugoslavia (CK KPJ). He was organizer of numerous strikes, demonstrations and other working-class protests in Peć and other places in Kosovo and Metohija such as the large anti-fascist demonstrations on 11 May 1940 and the March demonstrations in Peć in 1941.

== Second World War ==
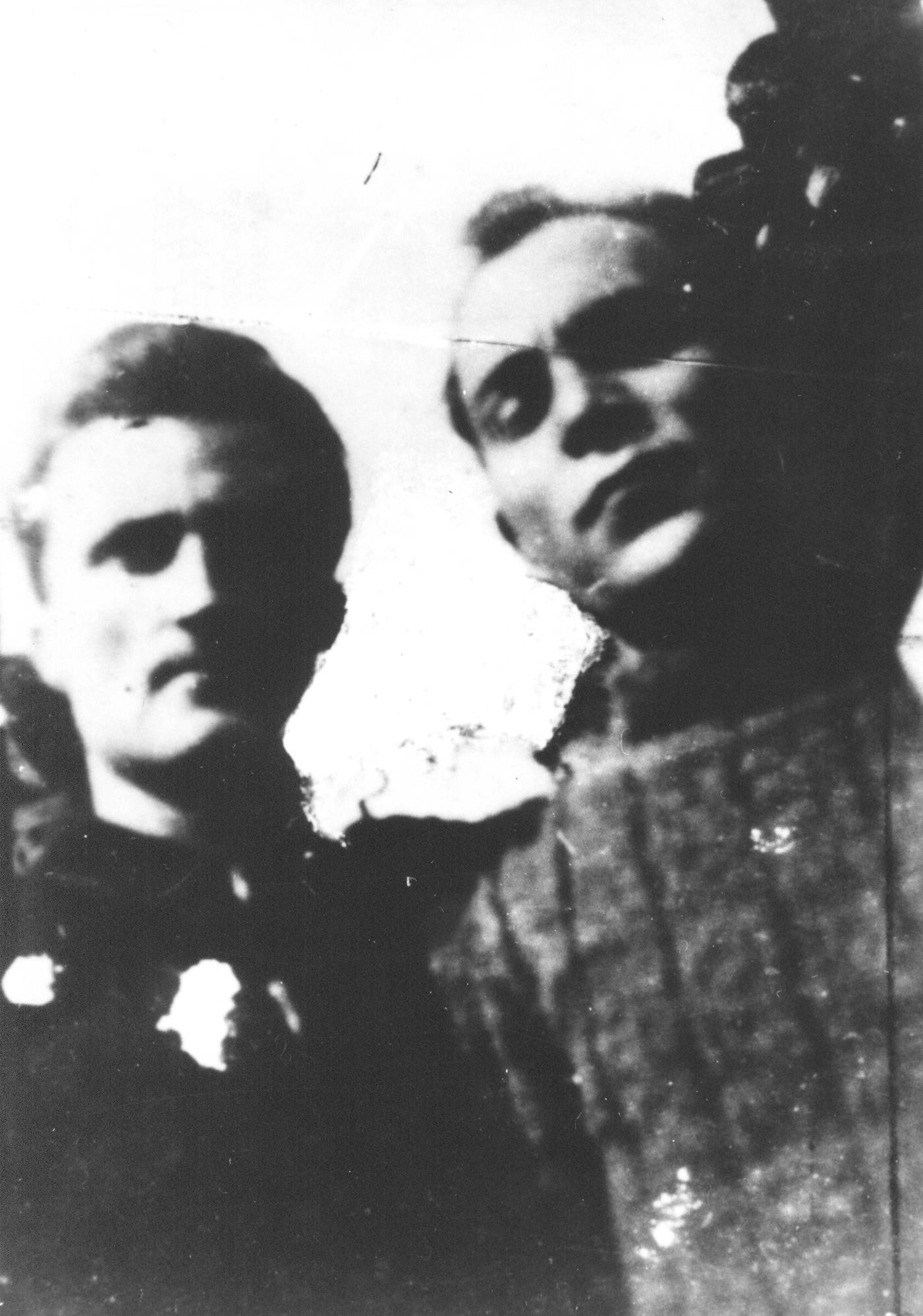
Vukmirović and Ramiz Sadiku in 1943

After the invasion and occupation of Yugoslavia in 1941, he worked on connecting party organizations and organizing armed battles in Kosovo and Metohija. First he was member of the Military Committee formed before the Regional Committee but after the arrest of Miladin Popović, he took over as secretary of KPJ Regional Committee for Kosovo and Metohija. By directive of the CK KPJ, he coordinated ties with Albanian communists and helped them link the Communist Party of Albania with the People's Liberation Struggle.

In October 1941, he was named as the political commisar for the Metohija Partisan Unit and in October 1942 he was chosen as a member of the temporary Main Unit of the Kosovo and Metohija Partisan units. He then founded the newspaper Glas naroda (Voice of the People) which he led until his death as a tribune of the KPJ Regional Committee and the People's Liberation Struggle in Kosovo and Metohija.

In April 1943, Vukmirović was in Đakovica/Gjakova along with Ramiz Sadiku. At that time, CK KPJ member Tempo Vukmanović left for Prizren. Boro and Ramiz had agreed to meet him there. On 7 April 1943 en route to Prizren in the village of Landovica, Boro and Ramiz were captured after being wounded in battles with Italian fascists and Albanian fascists known as the Balli Kombëtar. Knowing that they are high-ranking members of the Yugoslav Partisans, the Balli Kombëtar members tried to get information on other Partisans from them by torturing them. As Vukmirović and Sadiku didn't want to inform, it was decided that they were to be executed. On being demanded that they are to be executed individually, they put their arms around one another and shouted slogans supporting the Partisan cause and were executed together (on 10 April 1943).

== Legacy ==
On 6 March 1945 by decree of the presidency of the Anti-Fascist Council for the National Liberation of Yugoslavia, Vukmirović and Sadiku were posthumously awarded the Order of the People's Hero and were among the first to be recipients.

In the years after the Second World War, Boro and Ramiz became a symbol of Brotherhood and Unity of the Serbian/Montenegrin and Albanian people and of the anti-fascist struggle in Kosovo and Metohija. Numerous streets and schools bore their name along with the sports centre in Priština.

In 1963 on the twenty-year anniversary of their execution, a monument was made in the form of an obelisk with a mosaic and a memorial fountain and it was erected in Landovica in the spot they were executed. Poet Adem Gajtani dedicated the poem Boro dhe Ramiz to them.

== See also ==
- Ramiz Sadiku
