= Brezovo Polje, Brčko =

Brezovo Polje Брезово Поље
- Village
- Location within Bosnia and Herzegovina
- Coordinates: 44°50′46.02″N 18°57′20.24″E
- Country: Bosnia and Herzegovina
- Entity: Brčko District

Area
  - Total: 6.24 sq mi (16.17 km^{2})

Population (2013)
  - Total: 1,292
  - Density: 206.9/sq mi (79.90/km^{2})
- Time zone: UTC+1 (CET)
  - Summer (DST): UTC+2 (CEST)
- Postal code: 76216
- Area code: (+387) 49

Brezovo Polje (Serbian Cyrillic: Брезово Поље) is a village in north-eastern Bosnia and Herzegovina and is located within the Brčko District.

Brezovo Polje is located 14 km east of the city of Brčko. It is situated by the River Sava which has provided the village with fishing and recreation.

== Demographics ==
It is believed that Brezovo Polje was settled in the 1860s by Muslim refugees from Šabac and Užice, fleeing Serbia which was at war with the Ottoman Empire.

According to the 2013 census, its population was 1,292.

Ethnicity in 2013
| Ethnicity | Number | Percentage |
|---|---|---|
| Bosniaks | 694 | 53.7% |
| Serbs | 562 | 43.5% |
| Croats | 9 | 0.7% |
| other/undeclared | 27 | 2.1% |
| Total | 1,292 | 100% |

== Church of the Transfiguration of the Lord ==
The Church of the Transfiguration of the Lord was built in the year 1933 by contributions of Serb traders of that time. In the beginning of the World War II, Croat paramilitary force, the Ustashe demolished it to the ground. It was rebuilt in 1948. There are myths circulating that during the era of Socialist Federal Republic of Yugoslavia (SFRY) it was forbidden to visit the church and that there were cases when the police used the force on religious Serb civilians. Religion didn't have high status in the SFRY, but police efforts were usually used when there were suspicions of anti Yugoslav actions, by fascist forces which haven't been definitely defeated in World War II.

The inside of the church dates from year 1985 and the outside looks of the church date from year 1990.

== Azizija Mosque ==
The Azizija Mosque was built in the 1860s in Brezovo Polje as a result of the settlement of Muslim refugees from Serbia. The mosque was the cultural and religious monument representing the local Muslim population. The mosque was a substantial structure, with a large dome and a 30 m tall minaret. It is the only mosque in Bosnia and Herzegovina that was built in the Ottoman and Austro-Hungarian baroque style. The harem (graveyard) of the mosque contained a large number of tombstones (mezarje) from the late 19th century.

In the summer of 1992, following the expulsion of the Bosniak population of Brezovo Polje by Serb paramilitaries, the mosque was entirely demolished with dynamite. The rubble of this unique structure was removed to unknown locations and the site cleared completely. However, the reconstruction efforts are under way in 2009 to rebuild the structure which is under UNESCO protection due to its rarity, cultural and religious significance, and association with the history of Brezovo Polje.

== Sources ==
1. Commission to preserve national monuments
2. 1991 Official Federal Census of Bosnia-Herzegovina
