= Fetislam =

Fetislam; Novigrad
- Фетислам; Новиград
- Kladovo; Serbia
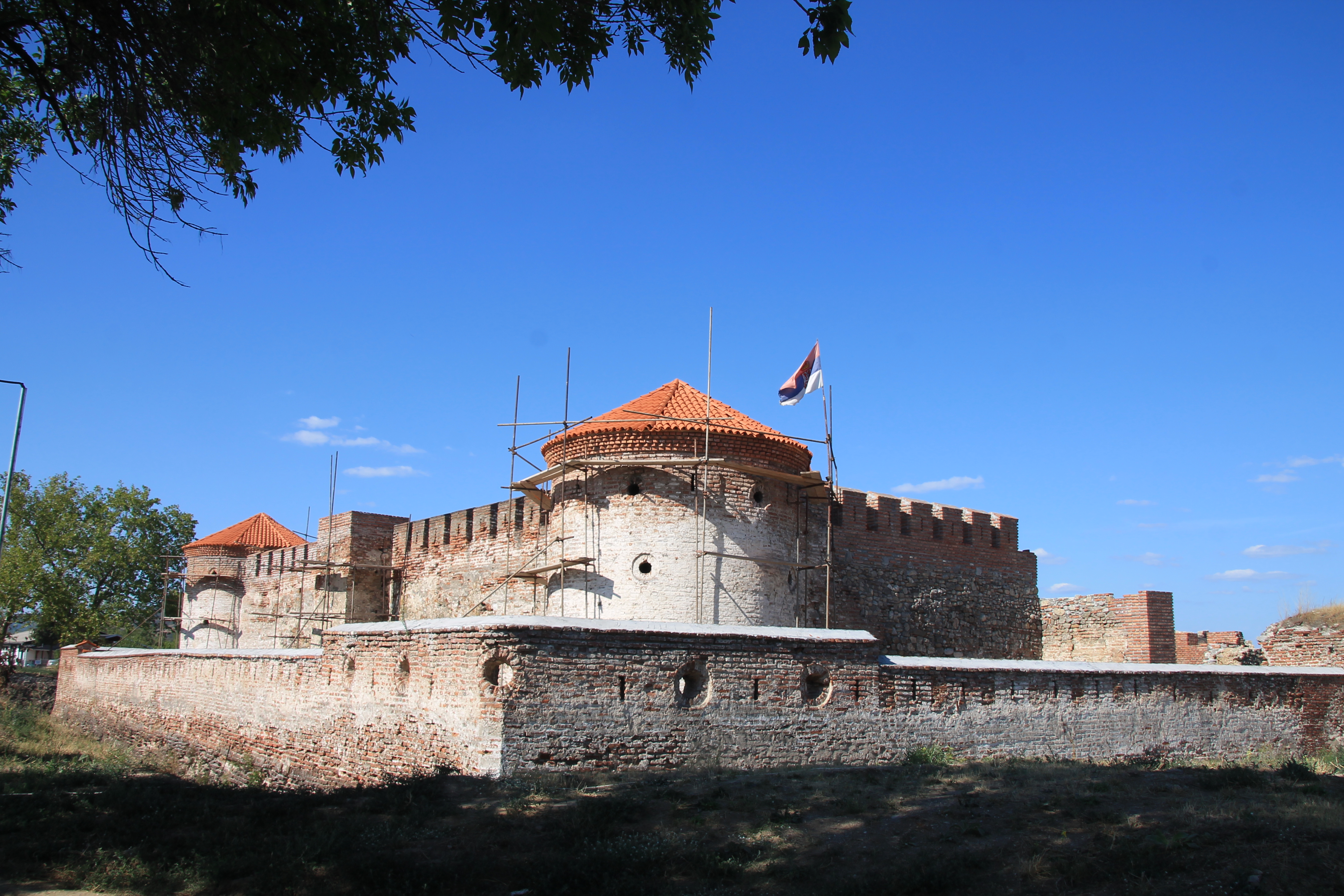
- Fetislam Fortress restoration, 2021

Site information
- Type: Strategic fortification
- Open to the public: Yes

Location
- Coordinates: 44°36′56″N 22°36′07″E

Site history
- Built: 1524
- Materials: Stone

Fetislam is a fortification situated a few kilometers upstream from the town of Kladovo, on the right bank of the Danube in Serbia. It has a status of a cultural monument of great importance in the Republic of Serbia.

== History ==
The fortress is located on a settlement called Novigrad ("New Town"). With the erection of Fetislam the Turkish defense line towards Hungary was completed and this line was made of fortresses in Smederevo, Kulič, Ram, Golubac and Fetislam. The last one was composed from two parts: the Smaller and the Greater town.

The Smaller town was erected around 1524 as a starting point of Turkish assaults on Transylvania. During the Austro-Turkish wars (1716–1718 and 1737–1739) the Smaller Town acquires strategic importance, thus the Greater Town was erected around it. Later around 1818 the dirt-built ramparts were topped with curtain walls. After the last reconstruction Fetislam was turned into an artillery bastion. The whole complex of this fortress was surrounded with a still visible deep and wide trench, which used to be filled with water from a Danube's branch.

The Turkish garrison stayed up until 1867, when Fetislam was handed over to the Serbian prince Mihajlo Obrenović along with six other cities.

Fetislam went through extensive renovations that completed in 2023. The entrance gates, lagoons, summer stage, and ramparts have been renovated. Additionally, a modern visitor center now connects the Smaller and Greater towns and houses exhibitions available to visitors.

== Gallery ==
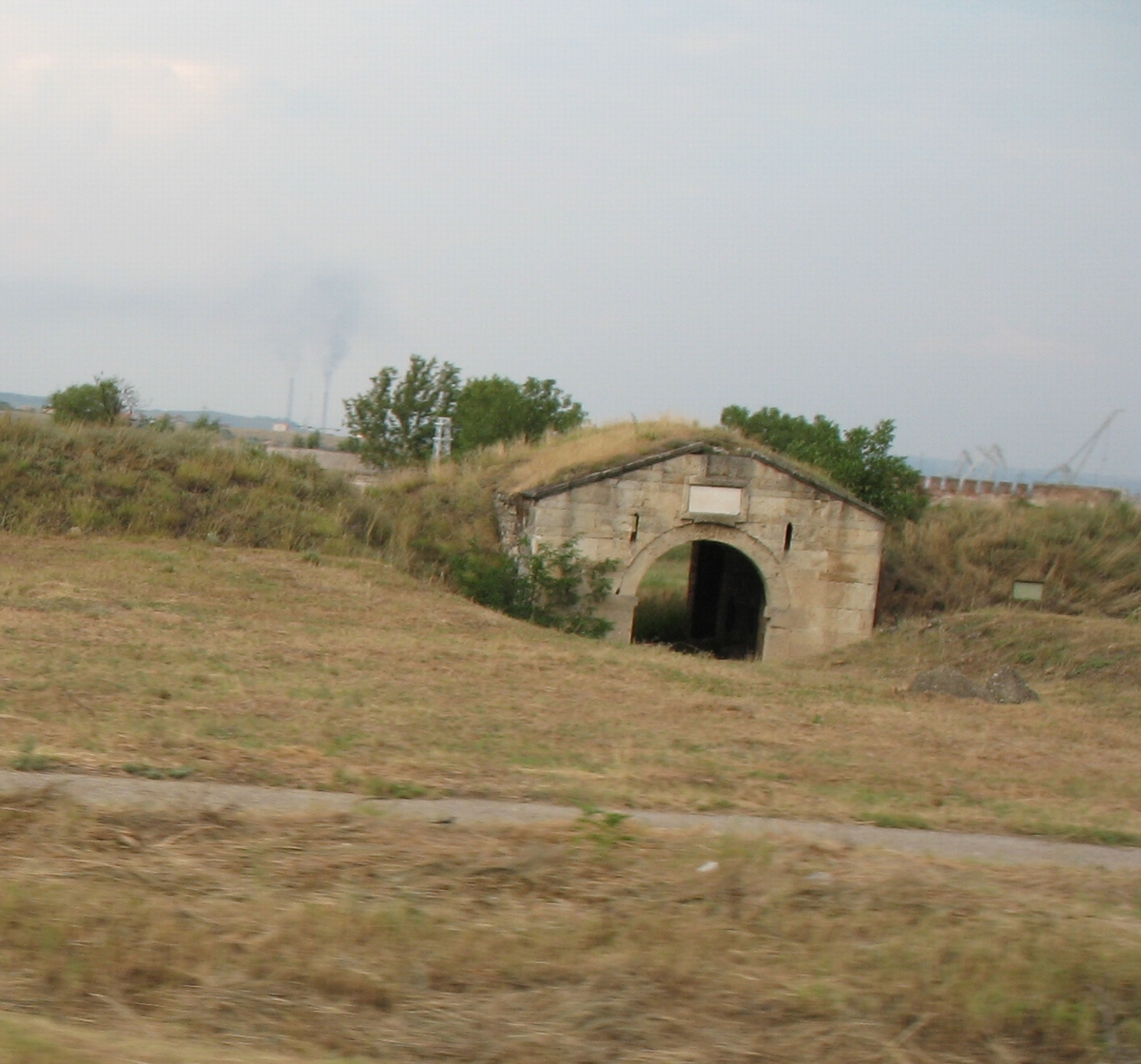
One of the gates of Fetislam

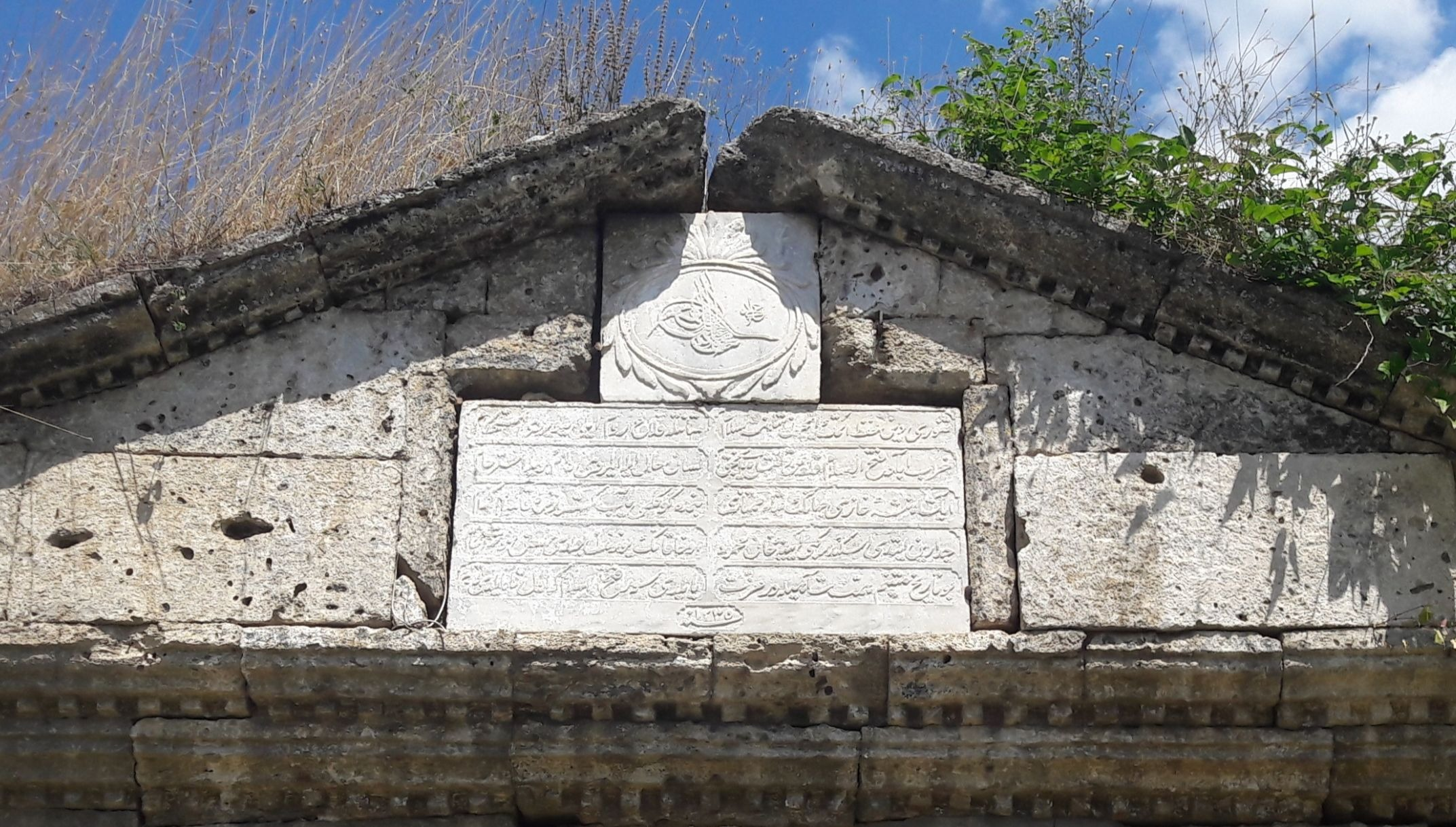
Inscription above the main gate

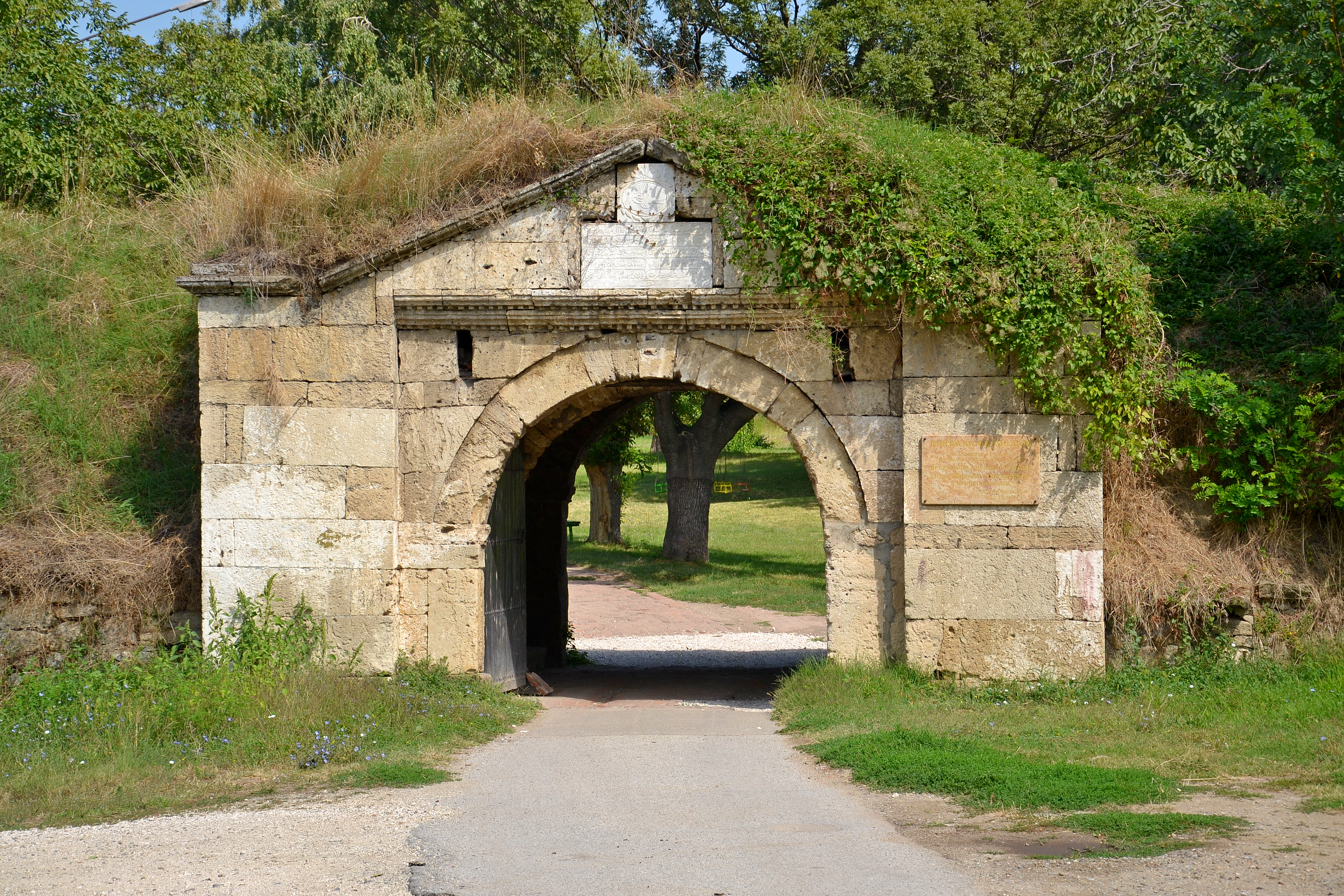
The main gate

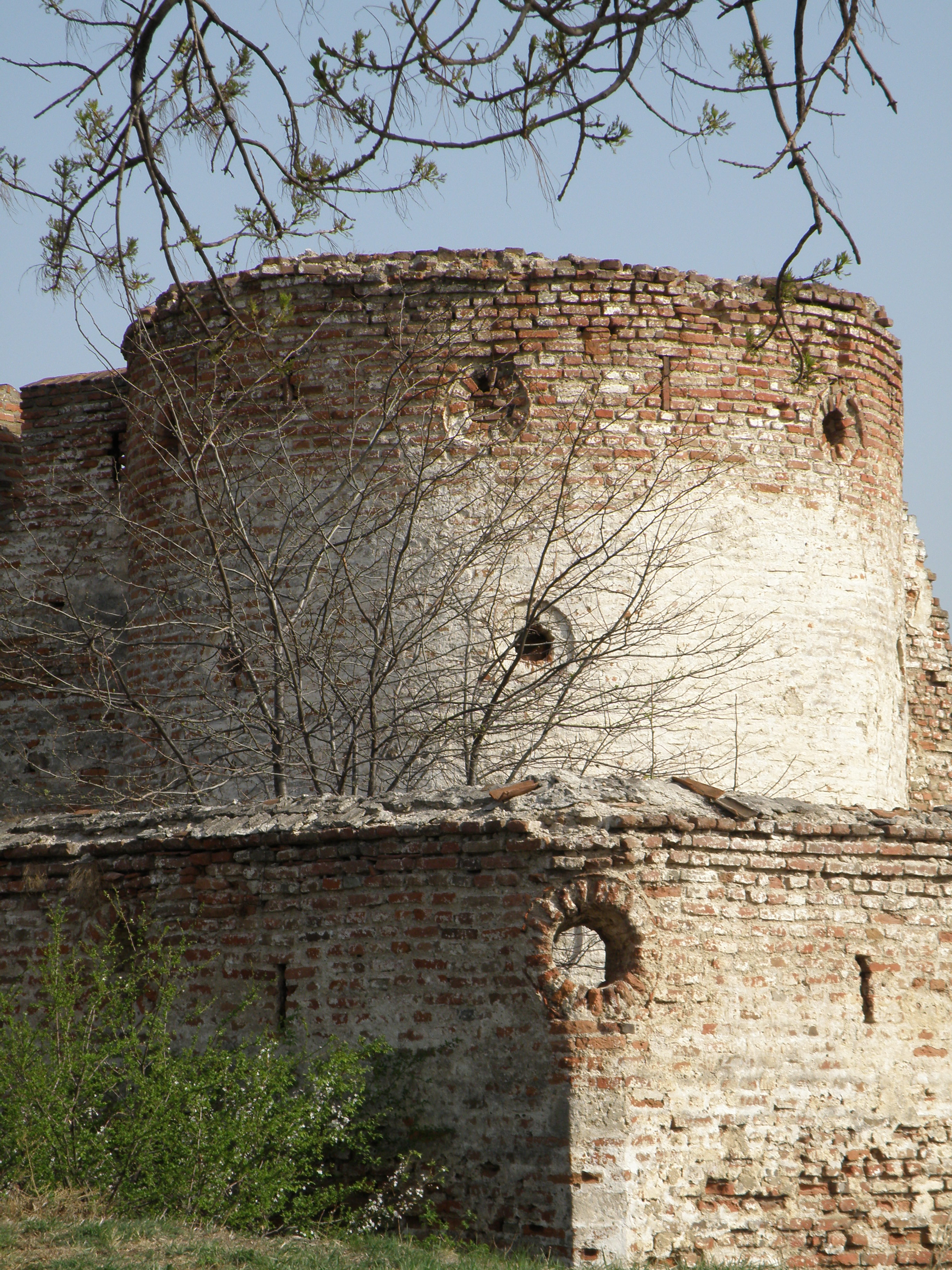
Tower

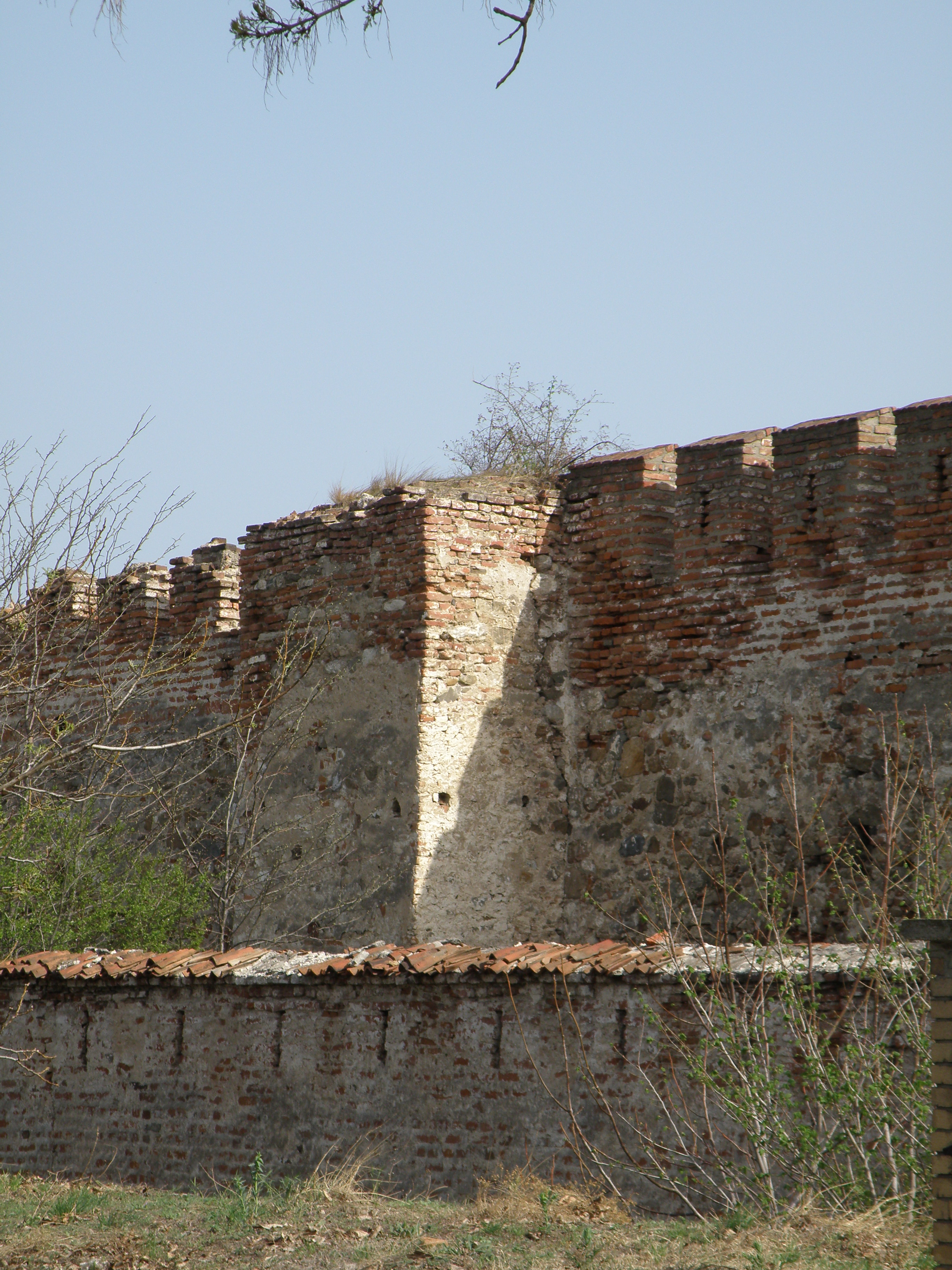
Fortress walls
