= Soko Grad (Ljubovija) =

Town and medieval fortification in Serbia

Soko Grad Соко Град
- near Sokobanja; Serbia
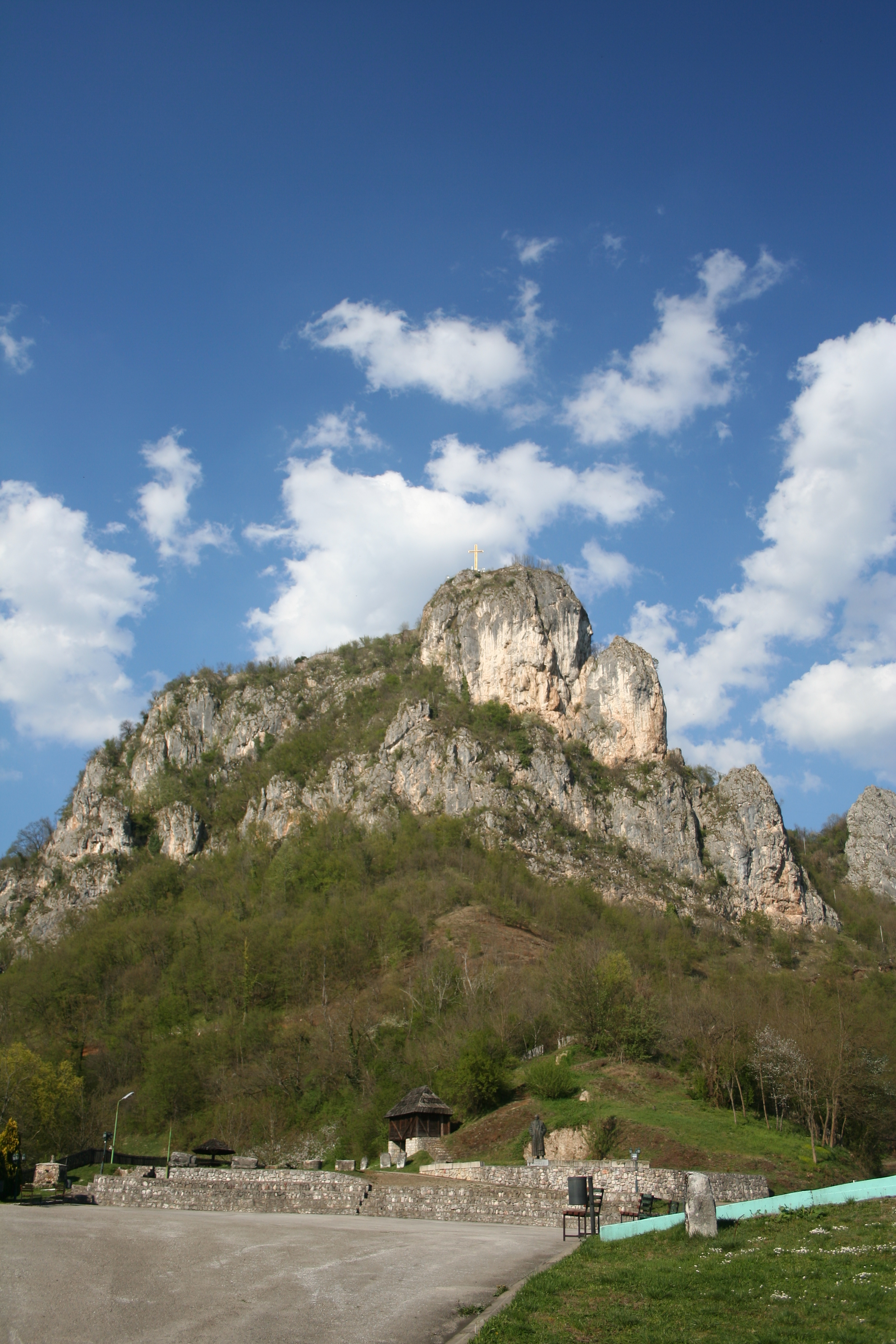
- Soko monastery under the site of the fortress

Site information
- Type: Strategic fortification
- Open to the public: Yes

Location
- Coordinates: 44.2701°N 19.4288°E

Site history
- Built: 6th century
- Built by: Justinian I
- Materials: Stone

Soko Grad (Serbian: Соко Град) is a former town and medieval fortification near the village of Sokolac, east of Ljubovija, western Serbia. The fortress was notable for never being conquered by an army.

== History ==
The fortress complex is dated to medieval Serbia, however the original fort was built by the Byzantine emperor Justinian I, much like Soko Grad in Sokobanja. It was first recorded in 1176 as a fort of Stefan Nemanja.

During the Ottoman occupation, the town became infamous for the notorious torture, persecution and conversion policy of the local orthodox population. There are documents from 1476 that mention that the administrator Sokol Kemal refortified and expanded the town's walls. For a long time, Sokol was a synonym for the Sultan's invincibility in the region; just like before, the fortress was never taken by an enemy army, getting the nickname Sultan's Bride.

It was one of the last bastions of the Turkish dominance in the region, and was one of the last fortifications in Serbia to remain in Ottoman possession. The Ottomans handed the fortified settlement and the surrounding area to Prince Mihailo Obrenović in accordance with the 1862 Kanlıca Conference. The local Muslim Slavic population was forced to either convert or leave the country. Most of them ended up in villages not far away in the Podrinje region of northeastern Bosnian eyalet, for example in Kozluk. The arrangement required the Serbs to demolish Sokol and many other major fortresses (among them the fortress of Užice) that had come under their control. Captain Petar Radojlović mined it.

The Soko Monastery (dedicated to St. Nicholas) was built at the foot of the town in 1994. In 2000, a large 13,6 metre cross was put on the highest point of Soko Grad with a helicopter of the Army of FR Yugoslavia (SCG).

== Characteristics ==
Sokol is built on tall and steep rock. The fortification system consists of the citadel - the upper town. The citadel itself consists of two fortified wholes. On the tallest ridge, there is an irregular shaped wall built partly around the rock, with two towers. One tower was protruded on the south side, and the other - main tower was facing the lower town (where the monastery is today). Under this tower, there is a remain of a water cistern. The entire side of the cliff under the main tower was walled by a 35–40 meters tall walls. In the lower part of the citadel there was one rectangle-based tower, which was the access point to the upper part of upper Soko. Under this gate tower, there were two more similar towers, facing the lower town. Inside the lower part of upper town, there are still visible traces of more fortification objects.

== Gallery ==
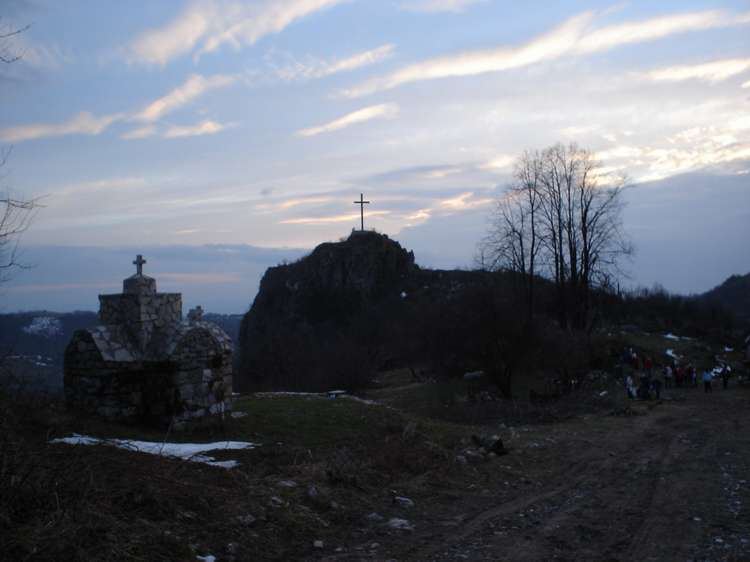
The cross, located at the remains of the upper town

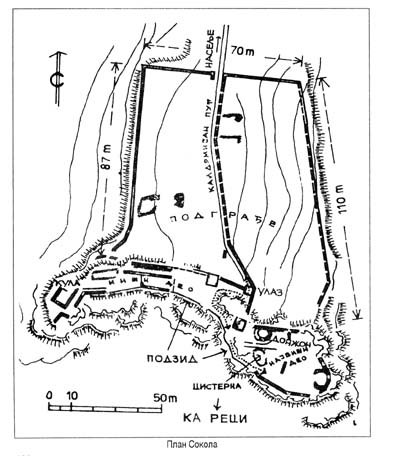
Layout of former fortress

== Sources ==
- Миливоје Васиљевић (2001), Соко - Град, Јанус; Rastko – via Rastko.rs
- Pavlović, Ljuba (2004). Соколска нахија. Sfairos. ISBN 86-7612-013-7 – via Google Docs.
