= Dvorska =

Dvorska may refer to:

- Dvorska, Serbia, a village near Krupanj
- Dvorska, Croatia, a village near Suhopolje
- Dvorska (Brno), a municipal part of Brno, Czech Republic
- Dvorská, Czech and Slovak surname
