= Stolice conference =

Former Yugoslav entity

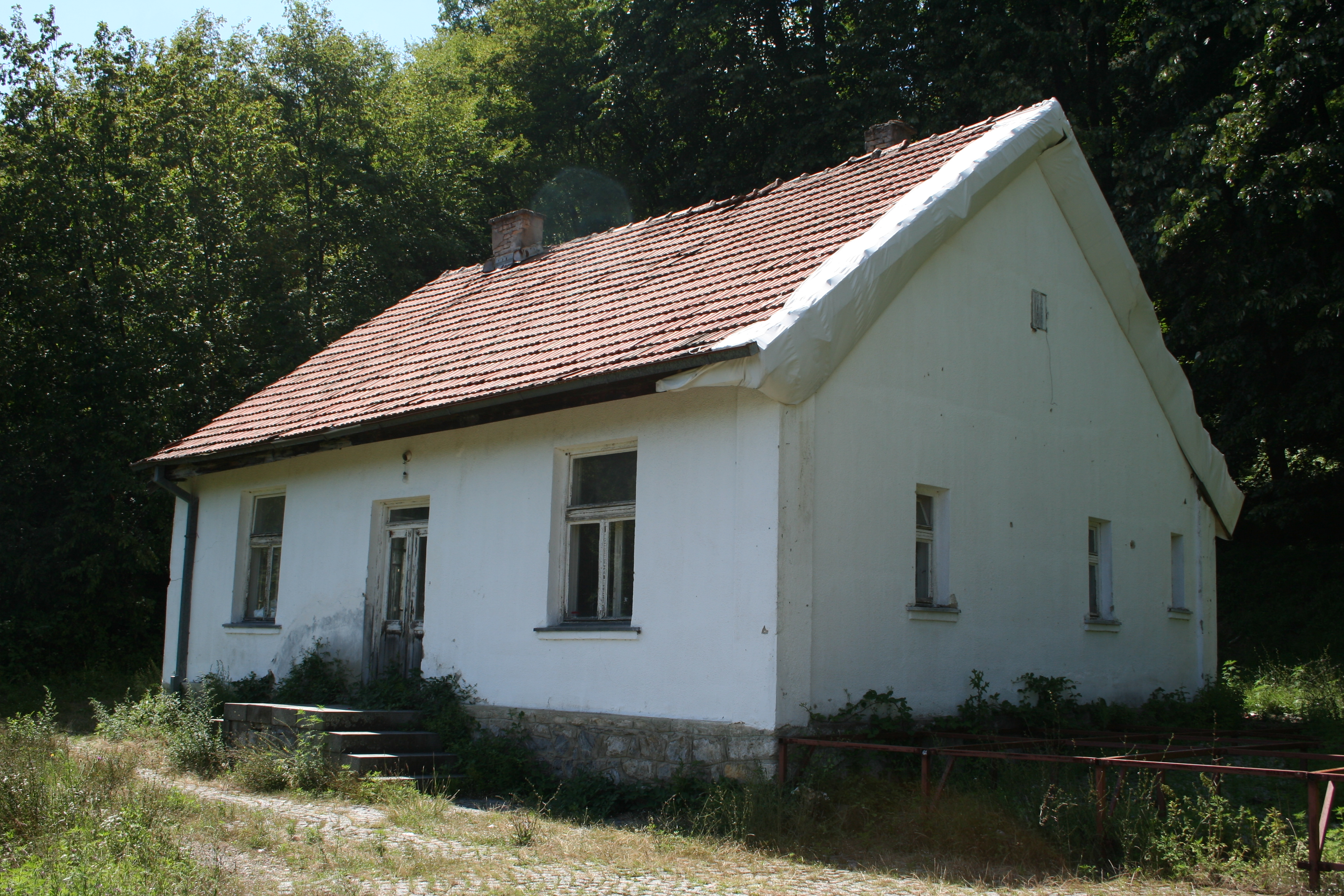
Stolice conference was held in this house owned by Zajača mine.

Stolice conference was a military-political conference of the leadership of the Yugoslav Partisans, held on 26 September 1941 in the village of Stolice (now part of Brštica), near Krupanj in present-day Serbia. The conference was led by the general secretary of the Communist Party of Yugoslavia and the commander of the Chief Headquarters Josip Broz Tito. It was attended by representatives of military and party leaders from Serbia, Croatia, Slovenia, Bosnia and Herzegovina and commanders of the nearest partisan detachments from Serbia.

At the conference, experiences were presented, issues of further liberation struggle were discussed, and important decisions were made for strengthening and developing further struggle. Chief Headquarters had to be formed in all the provinces, and the General Staff was renamed the Supreme Headquarters. Also at the conference, a unique name for the fighter was adopted - a partisan and his outer mark - a red five-pointed star.

== Background ==
In the period from July to August 1941, an armed uprising broke out in most of Yugoslavia and visible results were achieved. But in addition to visible successes, there were many difficulties. In Macedonia, there were difficulties due to the work of the secretary of the Provincial Committee of the CPY for Macedonia, Metodije Šatorov, and there has been no uprising yet. In some areas of Slovenia and Croatia, the uprising did not reach the expected proportions, while in Montenegro, under the attack of Italian divisions in the second half of July, the insurgent forces dispersed to their homes, and the liberation struggle temporarily subsided.

Thus, the momentum of the armed uprising put increasingly complex tasks before the leadership of the Central Committee of the Communist Party of Yugoslavia and the Chief Headquarters, as well as the delegates on the ground. The conditions for the operation of the Chief Headquarters from occupied Belgrade were increasingly difficult, and maintaining ties with the provincial committees, staffs and units was difficult and irregular. Therefore, in August 1941, the Politburo of the Central Committee of the Communist Party of Yugoslavia and Chief Headquarters decided to move to the liberated territory and to hold military-political consultations of the most responsible leaders and representatives of staffs from all parts of Yugoslavia.

Commander of the Chief Headquarters, Josip Broz Tito, left Belgrade on 16 September and went out through Čačak and Požega to the liberated territory of Valjevo countryside. Other members of military leadership: Ivan Milutinović, Aleksandar Ranković and Ivo Lola Ribar left Belgrade two days later. After coming on liberated territory, on 19 September 1941 Tito went to village Struganik, where he met his future opponent, colonel Dragoljub Mihailović. Tito tried to negotiate an alliance between the Partisans and Chetniks, but they failed to reach an agreement as the disparity of the aims of their respective movements was great enough to preclude any real compromise. After the meeting to left for Krupanj.

== The conference ==
Stolice conference was attended by members of the Central Committee of the Communist Party of Yugoslavia and the General Staff of NOPOJ: Josip Broz Tito, Ivan Milutinović, Aleksandar Ranković, and Ivo Lola Ribar, members of provincial leaderships: Sreten Žujović, Rodoljub Čolaković and Filip Kljajić from Serbia, Rade Končar and Vladimir Popović from Croatia; Franc Leskošek and Miha Marinko from Slovenia and Svetozar Vukmanović and Slobodan Princip from Bosnia and Herzegovina and commanders and political commissars of the nearest partisan detachments: Koča Popović, Nebojša Jerković, Miloš Minić, Zdravko Jovanović and Dragojlo Dudić.

Due to weak communication lines, the leadership in Montenegro was not informed about the counseling. Around same time a new Provincial Committee for and Provincial Staff for Macedonia were appointed, headed by Dragan Pavlović and Lazar Koliševski.

The most important decisions from the period of the uprising of 1941 were made on it: on the formation and organization of partisan units and staffs, on the development and competencies of provincial military staffs and detachment headquarters, and appropriate signs and symbols were introduced for all partisans.

The Chief Headquarters was renamed the Supreme Headquarters, as the only military leadership to lead the liberation struggle throughout the country. Instead of headquarters of different names, it was decided to form General Staffs in the provinces. The name "partisans" was adopted for all fighters in the entire country, and "partisan detachment" was adopted as the basic combat and tactical unit. The detachment consists of battalions composed of companies. It was decided that the detachment and battalion would be commanded by a staff consisting of: the commander, the political commissar and their deputies.

All headquarters were pointed out to the constant need to strengthen discipline and organize the intelligence, medical and quartermaster service, as well as a number of other issues of importance for the organization. It was also decided that groups of partisan detachments with special temporary staffs could be formed from several neighboring partisan detachments in order to perform joint tasks. All partisans were obliged to take the partisan oath by joining detachments, the text of which was published in the Bulletin of the General Staff on August 19, 1941.

== See also ==
- Operation Bullseye

== Bibliography ==
- Glišić, Venceslav; Miljanić, Gojko (1994). Rukovođenje Narodnooslobodilačkom borbom u Srbiji 1941–1945. Belgrade: Institut za savremenu istoriju. ISBN 86-7403-060-2.
- Roberts, Walter R. (1987). Tito, Mihailović and the allies: 1941–1945. New Brunswick, NJ: Duke University Press. ISBN 978-0-8223-0773-0.
- Tomasevich, Jozo (1975). War and Revolution in Yugoslavia, 1941–1945: The Chetniks. Stanford, California: Stanford University Press. ISBN 978-0-8047-0857-9.
