= Likodra =

Likodra may refer to:

- Likodra (village), northeast of Krupanj, Serbia
- Likodra (river), tributary of Jadar
