= Dworsky =

Dworsky is a surname, a Germanized and Anglicized version of Czech-Slovak surname Dvorský. Notable people with the surname include:

- Alexis Dworsky (born 1976), German conceptual artist, cultural scientist and professor
- Charlie Dworsky-Hickey, birth name of Charlie Hickey (born 1999), American musician
- Dan Dworsky (1927 – 2022), American architect
- Rich Dworsky, American composer and band leader of Guys All-Star Shoe Band, the musicians for A Prairie Home Companion
- Rudolf Dworsky (1882–1927), German film producer and director
- Sally Dworsky, American singer-songwriter and playback singer

== See also ==
- Dvorský, Czech and Slovak surname
