= Mojković =

- Village (Selo)
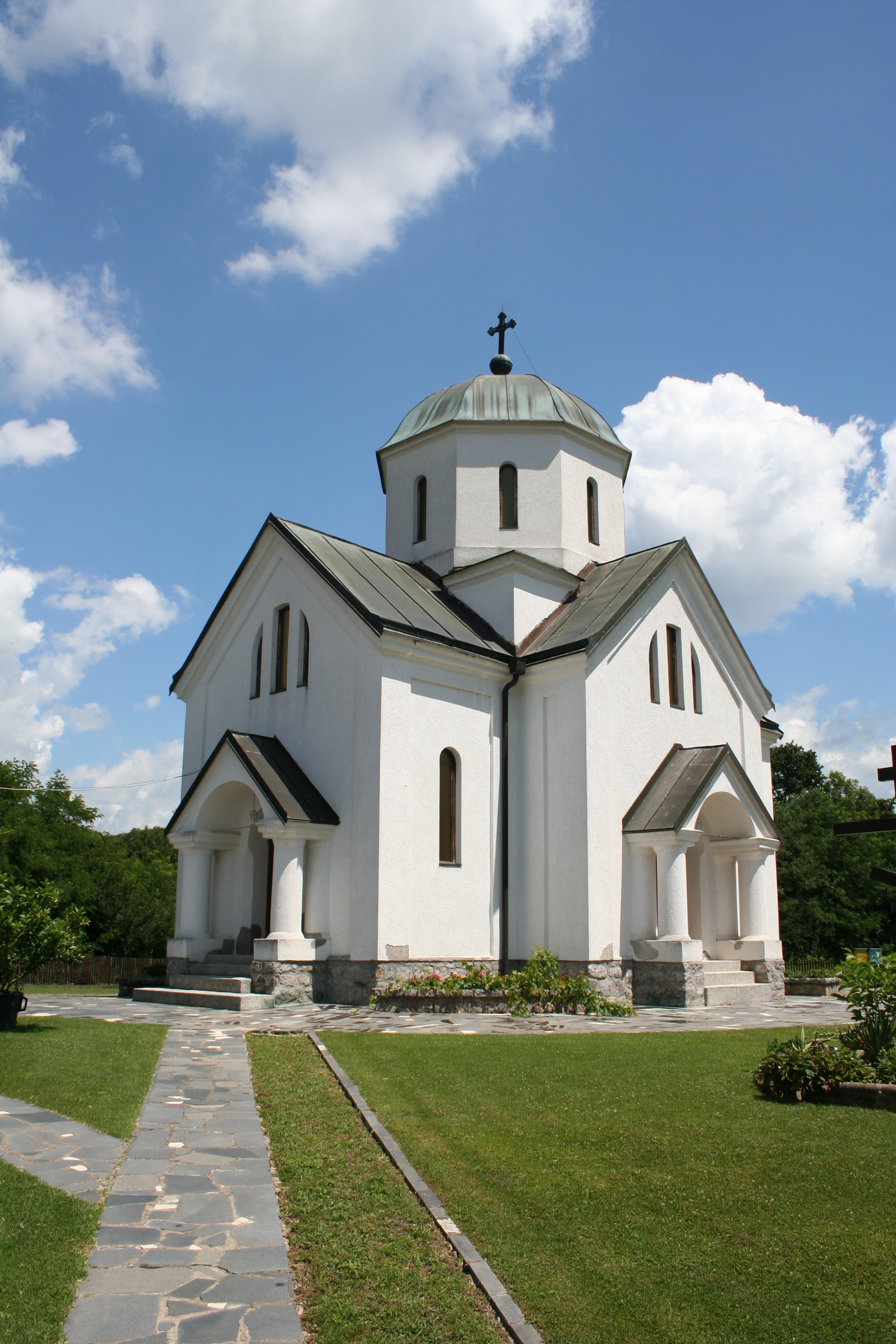

- Location of Mojković in Serbia
- Coordinates: 44°26′N 19°29′E
- Country: Serbia
- District: Mačva District
- Municipality: Krupanj

Population (2002)
  - Total: 790
- Time zone: UTC+1 (CET)
  - Summer (DST): UTC+2 (CEST)

Mojković is a village in the municipality of Krupanj, Serbia. According to the 2002 census, the village has a population of 790 people.
