= Brezovice (Krupanj) =

Coordinates: 44°23′42.00″N 19°28′45.84″E

Brezovice Брезовице
- Village (Selo)
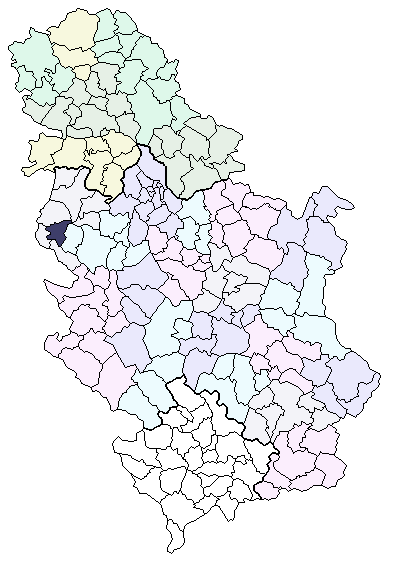
- Location of the Krupanj municipality in Serbia
- Country: Serbia
- District: Mačva District
- Municipality: Krupanj

Population (2002)
  - Total: 964
- Time zone: UTC+1 (CET)
  - Summer (DST): UTC+2 (CEST)

Brezovice (Serbian Cyrillic: Брезовице) is a village in the municipality of Krupanj in western Serbia. According to the 2002 census, the village has a population of 964 people.

== Historical population ==
- 1948: 1,631
- 1953: 1,677
- 1961: 1,520
- 1971: 1,362
- 1981: 1,186
- 1991: 1,066
- 2002: 964

== See also ==
- List of places in Serbia
