= Stave (Krupanj) =

- Village
- Location within Serbia
- Coordinates: 44°20′N 19°28′E
- Country: Serbia
- District: Mačva District
- Municipality: Krupanj

Population (2002)
  - Total: 450
- Time zone: UTC+1 (CET)
  - Summer (DST): UTC+2 (CEST)

Stave is a village in the municipality of Krupanj, Serbia. According to the 2002 census, the village has a population of 450 people.
