= Tolisavac =

- Village (Selo)
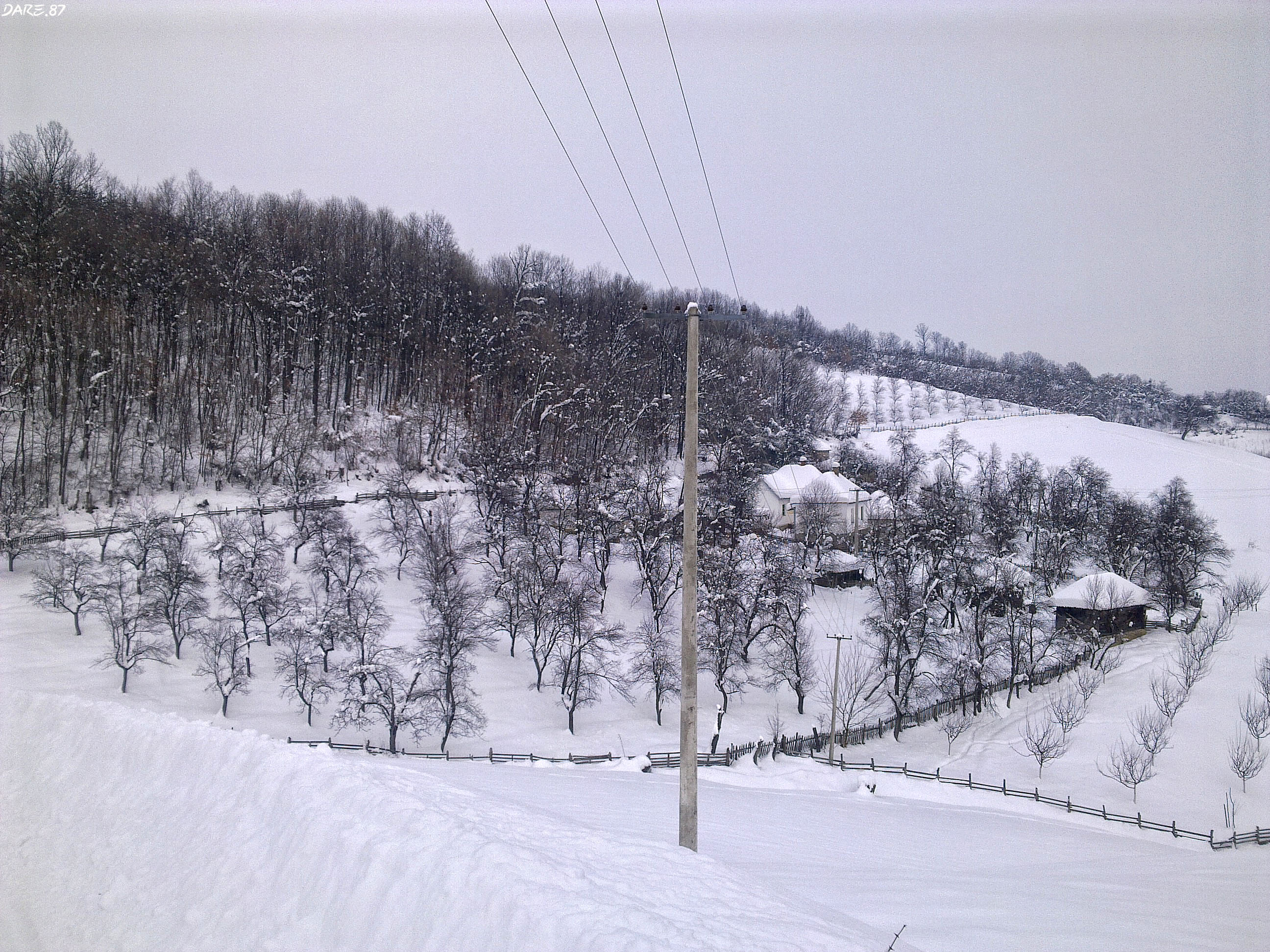
- Tolisavac

- Location within Serbia
- Coordinates: 44°21′10″N 19°23′20″E
- Country: Serbia
- District: Mačva District
- Municipality: Krupanj
- Time zone: UTC+1 (CET)
  - Summer (DST): UTC+2 (CEST)

Tolisavac (Serbian Cyrillic: Толисавац) is a village in Serbia. It is situated in the Krupanj municipality, in the Mačva District of Central Serbia. The village had a population of 667 in 2002, all of whom were ethnic Serbs.

== Historical population ==
- 1948: 1,144
- 1953: 1,179
- 1961: 1,052
- 1971: 964
- 1981: 844
- 1991: 824
- 2002: 667

== See also ==
- List of places in Serbia
