= Church of Holy Ascension, Krupanj =

Church of Holy Ascension
- Црква вазнесња Господњег; Crkva vaznesenja Gospodnjeg
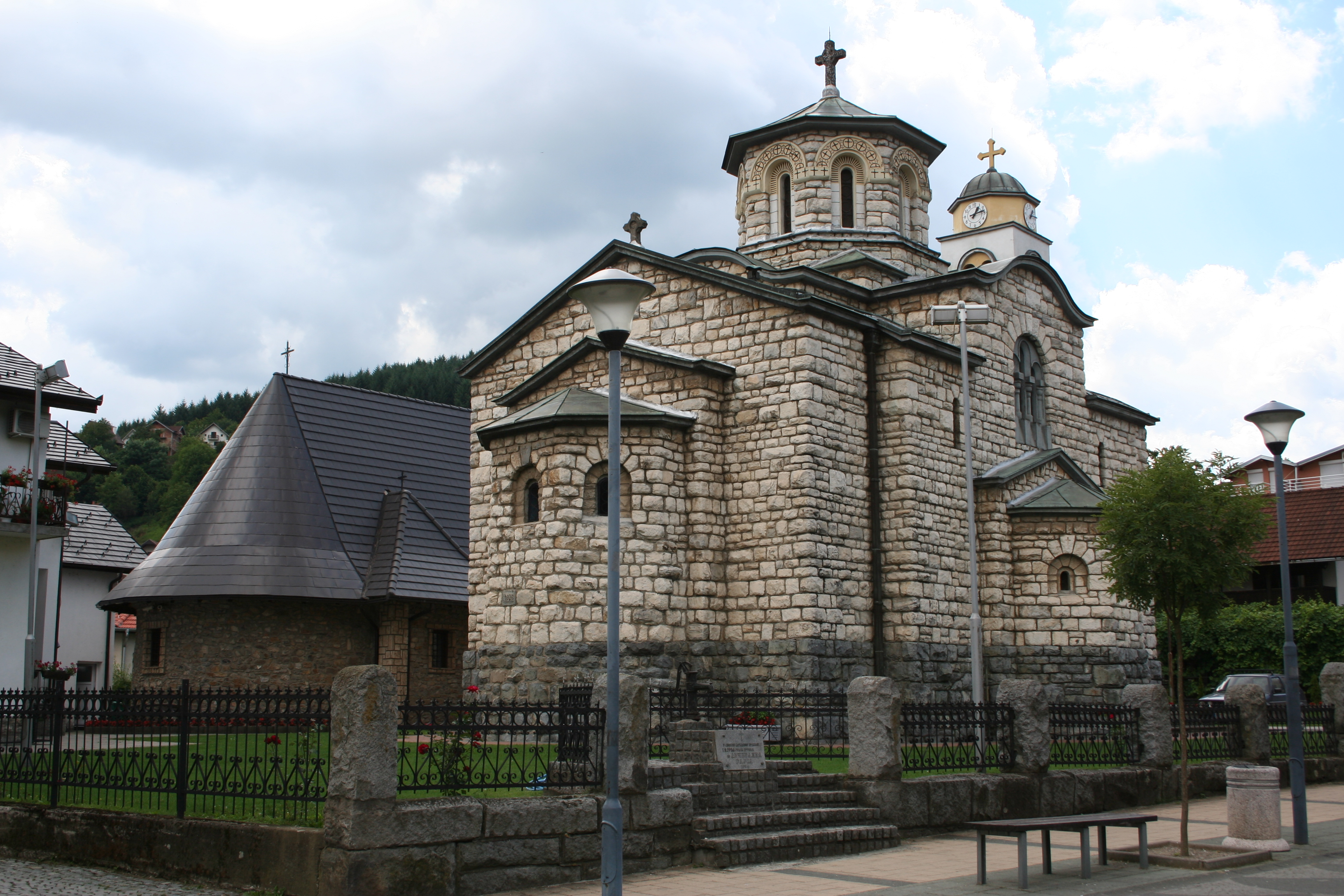
- Church of Holy Ascension
- Church of Holy Ascension
- Location: Krupanj
- Country: Serbia
- Denomination: Serbian Orthodox

History
- Dedication: Holy Ascension

The Church of Holy Ascension is a Serbian Orthodox church in Krupanj in western Serbia. The church was erected in 1932 as a memorial for fallen soldiers who participated in the Battle of Mačkov kamen in 1914 during the First World War. An ossuary was also built on Mačkov kamen in 1931. The relics of fighters are on both sites, and photographs from the battlefield and wreaths are on display in the church's crypt. There is also a monument in the crypt to Major Svetislav Marković, who led the soldiers in a suicide attack on the Austrian army.
