= Šljivova =

- Village (Selo)
- Location within Serbia
- Coordinates: 44°19′N 19°26′E
- Country: Serbia
- District: Mačva District
- Municipality: Krupanj

Population (2002)
  - Total: 849
- Time zone: UTC+1 (CET)
  - Summer (DST): UTC+2 (CEST)

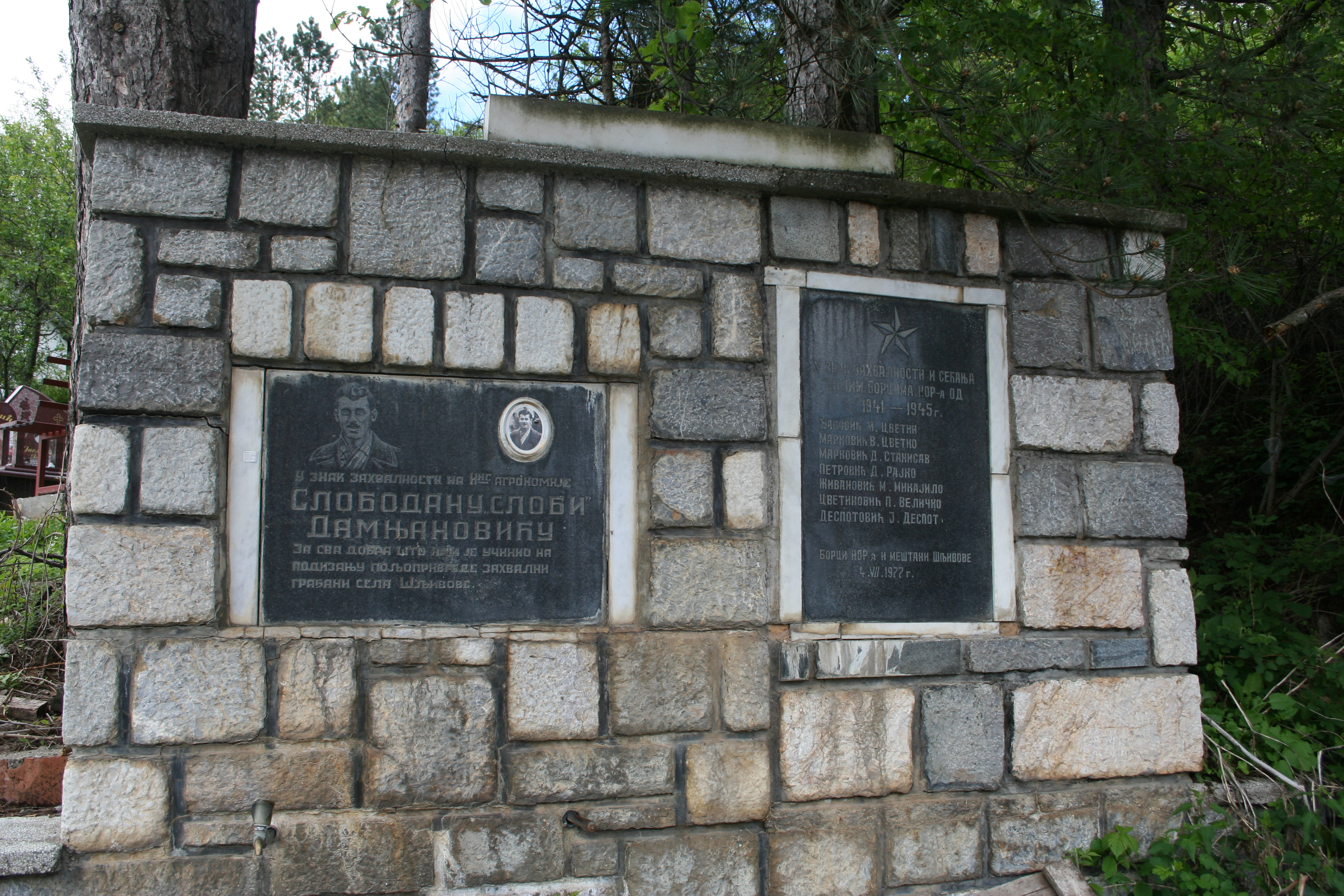

Šljivova is a village in the municipality of Krupanj, Serbia. According to the 2002 census, the village has a population of 849 people.
