= Cerova (Krupanj) =

- Village (Selo)
- Location within Serbia
- Coordinates: 44°24′00″N 19°22′49″E
- Country: Serbia
- District: Mačva District
- Municipality: Krupanj

Population (2002)
  - Total: 965
- Time zone: UTC+1 (CET)
  - Summer (DST): UTC+2 (CEST)

Cerova is a village in the municipality of Krupanj, Serbia. According to the 2002 census, the village had Serb ethnic majority and a population of 965 people.

== Historical population ==
- 1953: 1,497
- 1961: 1,469
- 1971: 1,356
- 1981: 1,237
- 1991: 1,070
- 2002: 965
