= Krasava =

Coordinates: 44°25′N 19°25′E

- Village
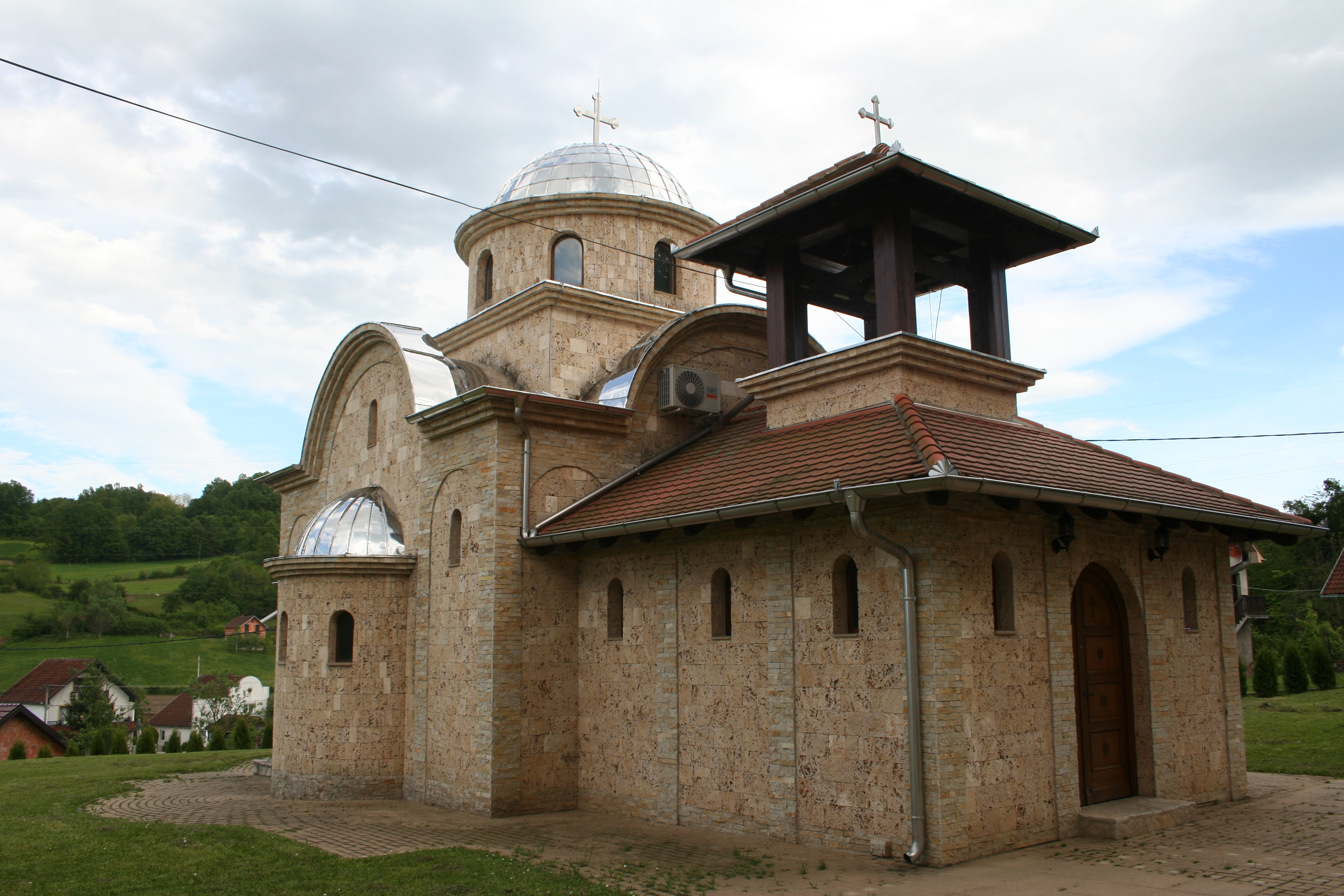
- Church of St. Friday Romans, Beautiful
- Interactive map of Krasava
- Country: Serbia
- District: Mačva District
- Municipality: Krupanj

Population (2002)
  - Total: 649
- Time zone: UTC+1 (CET)
  - Summer (DST): UTC+2 (CEST)

Krasava is a village in the municipality of Krupanj, Serbia. According to the 2002 census, the village has a population of 649 people.
