= Boranja =

Mountain in Serbia

- Location within Serbia

Highest point
- Elevation: 856 m (2,808 ft)
- Coordinates: 44°22′34″N 19°15′32″E

Geography
- Location: Western Serbia
- Parent range: Dinaric Alps

Boranja (Serbian Cyrillic: Борања) is a mountain in western Serbia, above the Drina river, between the towns of Krupanj and Mali Zvornik. Its highest peak Crni vrh has an elevation of 856 m (2,808 ft) above sea level.

== See also ==
- List of mountains in Serbia
