= Stolice =

Coordinates: 44.4007°N 19.3309°E

Stolice (Serbian Cyrillic: Столице) is a part of the village Brštica near Krupanj in Serbia. It became known in history as the place where the military-political advising executives of the National liberation movement of Yugoslavia held their session on 26 September 1941.

== Stolice museum ==
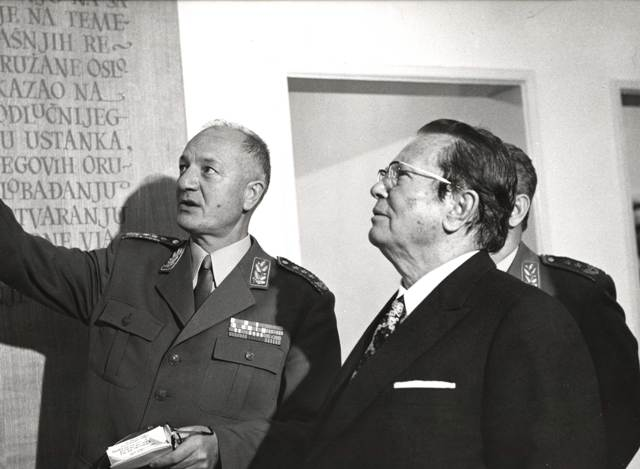
President of Yugoslavia Josip Broz Tito visiting the memorial in Stolice in 1975.

The session was held in the Zajača mine, which was later converted into a museum. The exhibition was initially a reconstruction of the room where the conference was held. In 1979 an exhibition, that points out the importance of the event, was set. Partisan Kurir a sculpture by Stevan Bodnarov was put next to the house in 1954. In 1981 four reconstructed pavilions of pine, were built at the site were the old mining barracks once stood with the intention to serve as an exhibition space. That same year, a sculpture "Tito" by Antun Augustinčić was put in front of the house and the architect Milun Stambolić did a gatehouse. During the 1990s, the exhibition was closed and two sculptures were repeatedly thrown into the abyss just in front of the memorial home.
