= Ravnaja =

Coordinates: 44°21′10.08″N 19°23′20.04″E

- Village (Selo)
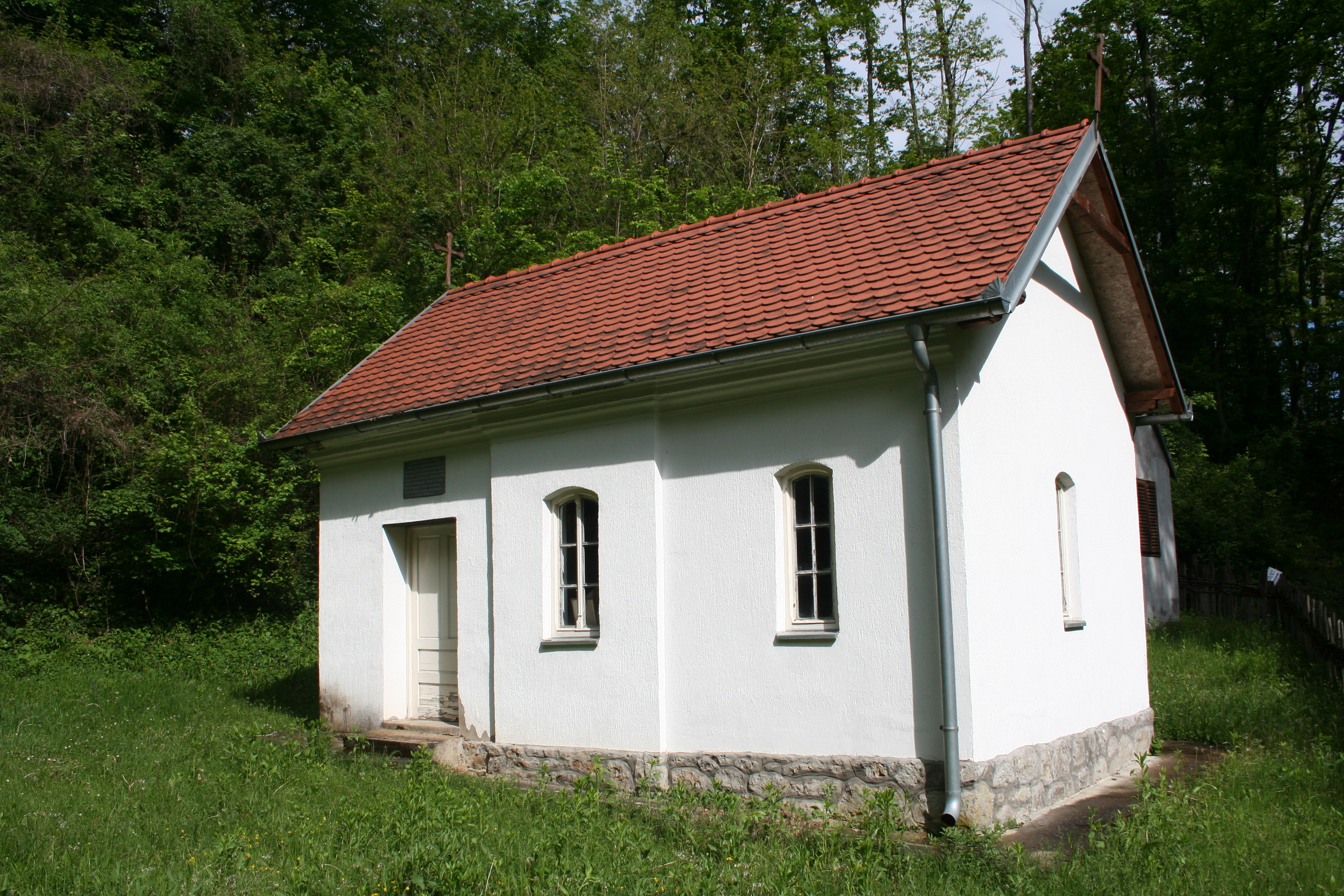
- Interactive map of Ravnaja
- Country: Serbia
- Municipality: Krupanj
- Time zone: UTC+1 (CET)
  - Summer (DST): UTC+2 (CEST)

Ravnaja (Serbian Cyrillic: Равнаја) is a village in Serbia. It is situated in the Krupanj municipality, in the Mačva District of Central Serbia. The village had a population of 323 in 2002, all of whom were ethnic Serbs.

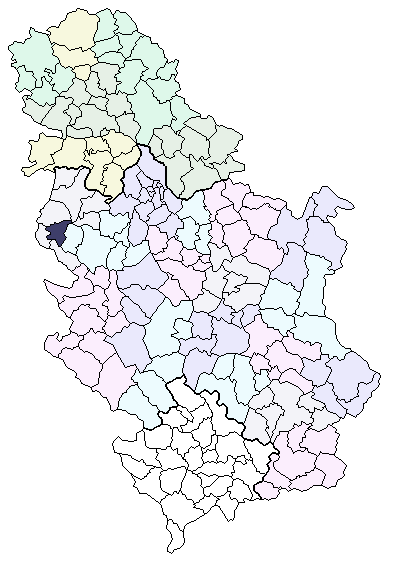
Location of the Krupanj municipality in Serbia

== Historical population ==
- 1948: 700
- 1953: 732
- 1961: 630
- 1971: 560
- 1981: 456
- 1991: 389
- 2002: 323

== See also ==
- List of places in Serbia
