= Banjevac =

Banjevac Бањевац (Serbian)
- Village (Selo)
- Location within Serbia
- Coordinates: 44°21′10.08″N 19°23′20.04″E
- Country: Serbia
- Municipality: Krupanj
- Time zone: UTC+01:00 (CET)
  - Summer (DST): UTC+02:00 (CEST)

Banjevac (Serbian Cyrillic: Бањевац) is a village in Serbia. It is situated in the Krupanj municipality, in the Mačva District of Central Serbia.

== Population ==
The village had a Serb ethnic majority and a population of 500 in 2002.

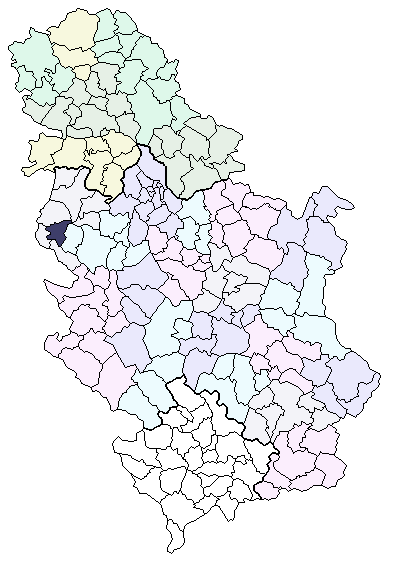
Location of the Krupanj municipality in Serbia

== Historical population ==
- 1948: 669
- 1953: 648
- 1961: 606
- 1971: 605
- 1981: 519
- 1991: 525
- 2002: 500

== See also ==
- List of places in Serbia
