= Cvetulja =

Coordinates: 44°27′51.84″N 19°33′34.92″E

- Village (Selo)
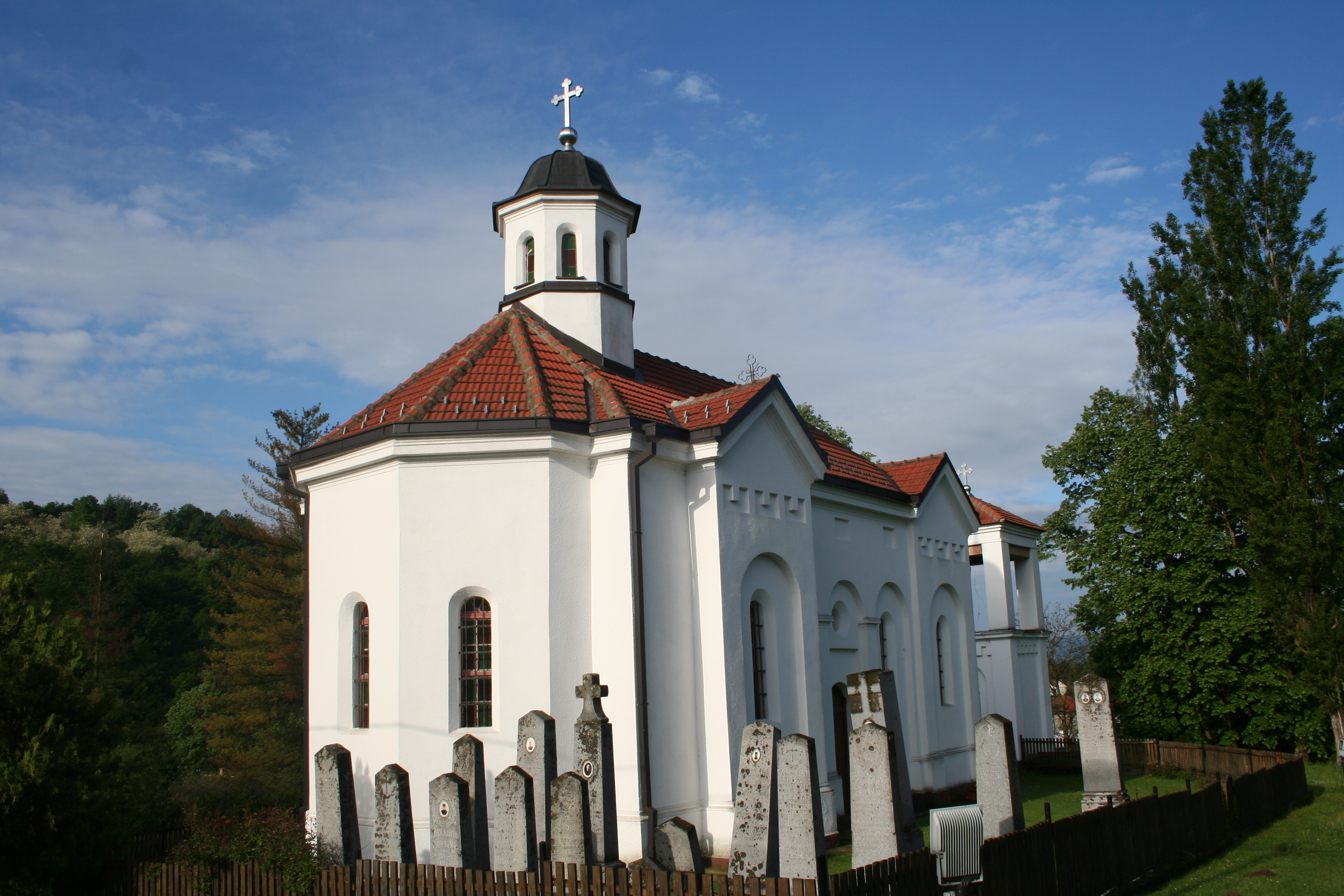
- Interactive map of Cvetulja
- Country: Serbia
- Municipality: Krupanj
- Time zone: UTC+1 (CET)
  - Summer (DST): UTC+2 (CEST)

Cvetulja (Serbian Cyrillic: Цветуља) is a village in Serbia. It is situated in the Krupanj municipality, in the Mačva District of Central Serbia. The village had a Serb ethnic majority and a population of 274 in 2002.

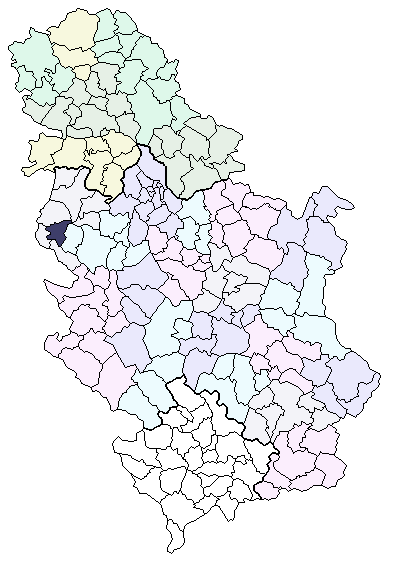
Location of the Krupanj municipality in Serbia

== Historical population ==
- 1948: 687
- 1953: 680
- 1961: 588
- 1971: 513
- 1981: 435
- 1991: 298
- 2002: 274

== See also ==
- List of places in Serbia
