= Kržava, Krupanj =

Village in the municipality of Krupanj, Serbia

Coordinates: 44.3542°N 19.3447°E

Kržava
- Village
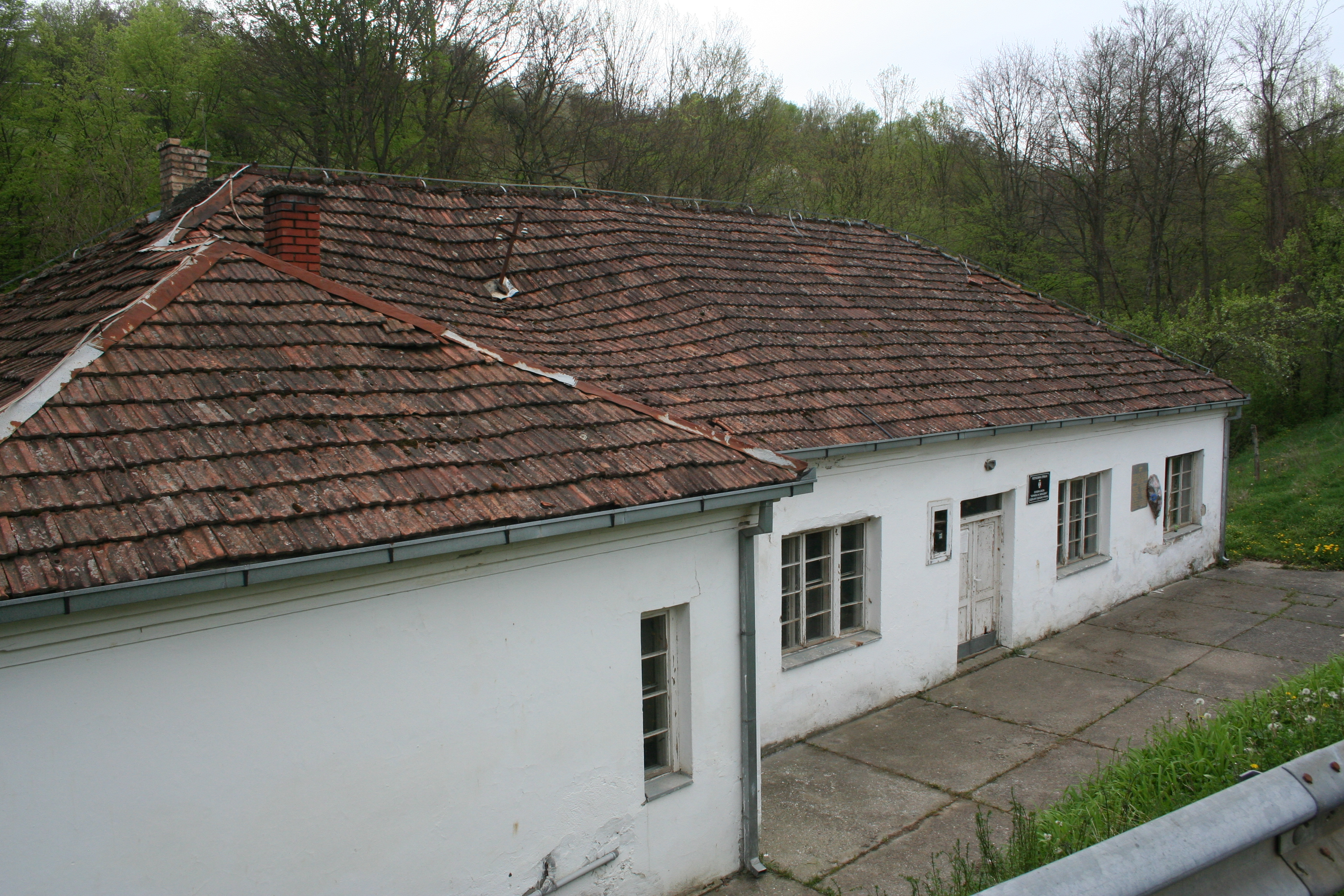
- A School building in Kržava
- Interactive map of Kržava
- Country: Serbia
- District: Mačva District
- Municipality: Krupanj

Population (2002)
  - Total: 806
- Time zone: UTC+1 (CET)
  - Summer (DST): UTC+2 (CEST)

Kržava is a village in the municipality of Krupanj, Serbia. According to the 2002 census, the village has a population of 806 people.
