= Dvorský =

Dvorský (feminine: Dvorská) is a Czech and Slovak surname. It is derived from dvůr (Czech) / dvor (Slovak), meaning 'court' (royal court, court of a nobleman), and can be translated as "someone from a court". Notable people with the surname include:

- Bohumír Dvorský (1902–1976), Czech painter
- Dalibor Dvorský (born 2005), Slovak ice hockey player
- George Dvorsky (born 1970), Canadian bioethicist, transhumanist and futurist
- Jakub Dvorský (born 1978), Czech video game designer
- Lucia Dvorská (born 1988), Slovak model
- Milena Dvorská (1938–2009), Czech actress
- Miroslav Dvorský (born 1960), Slovak operatic tenor
- Pavlo Dvorsky (born 1953), Ukrainian singer and composer
- Peter Dvorský (born 1951), Slovak operatic tenor
- Peter Dvorsky (actor) (1948–2019), Canadian actor
- Robert Dvorsky (born 1948), American politician
- Rudolf Antonín Dvorský (1899–1966), Czech musician

== See also ==
- 16241 Dvorsky, main-belt asteroid
- Dworsky
