= Krupanj =

Krupanj Крупањ (Serbian)
- Town and municipality
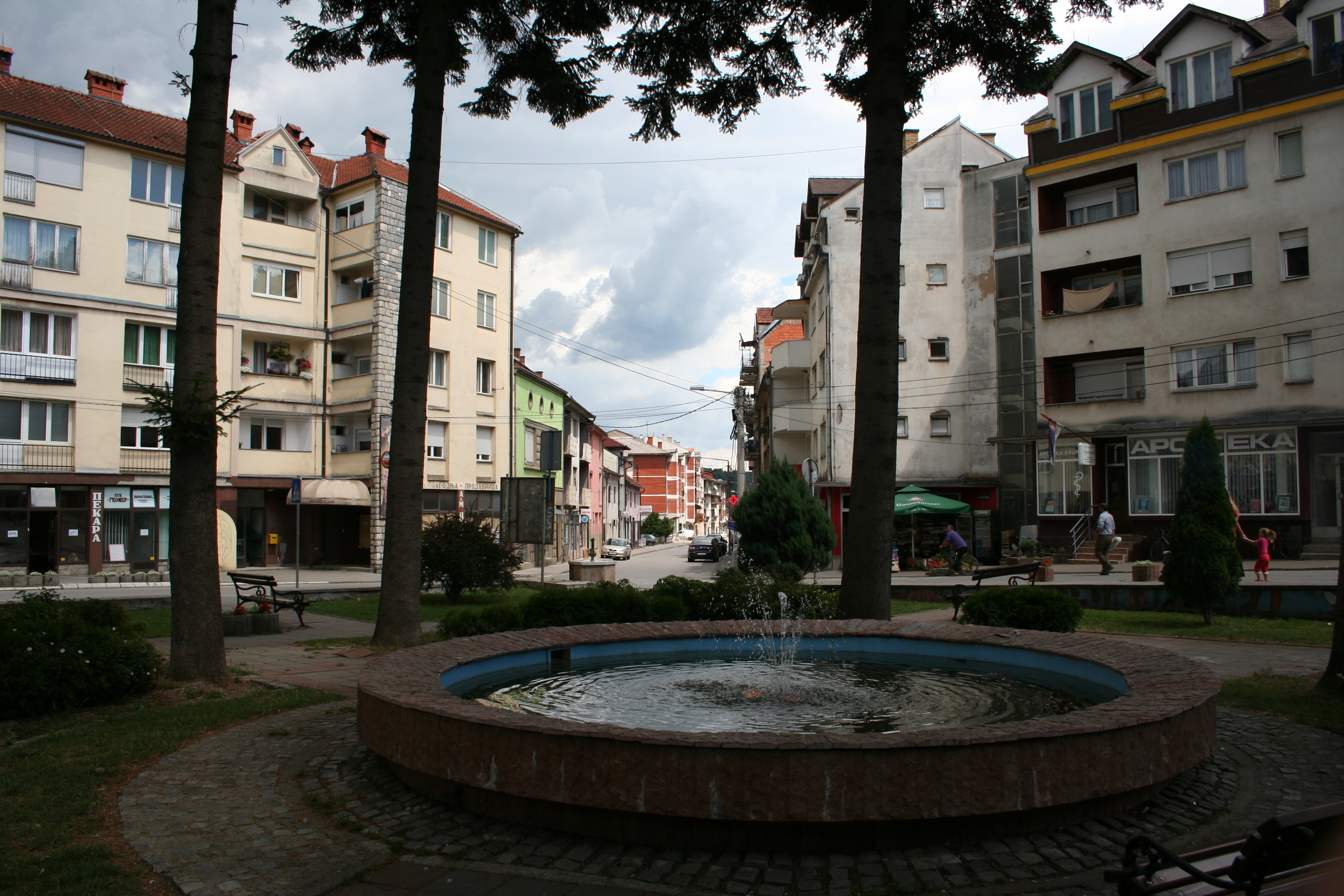
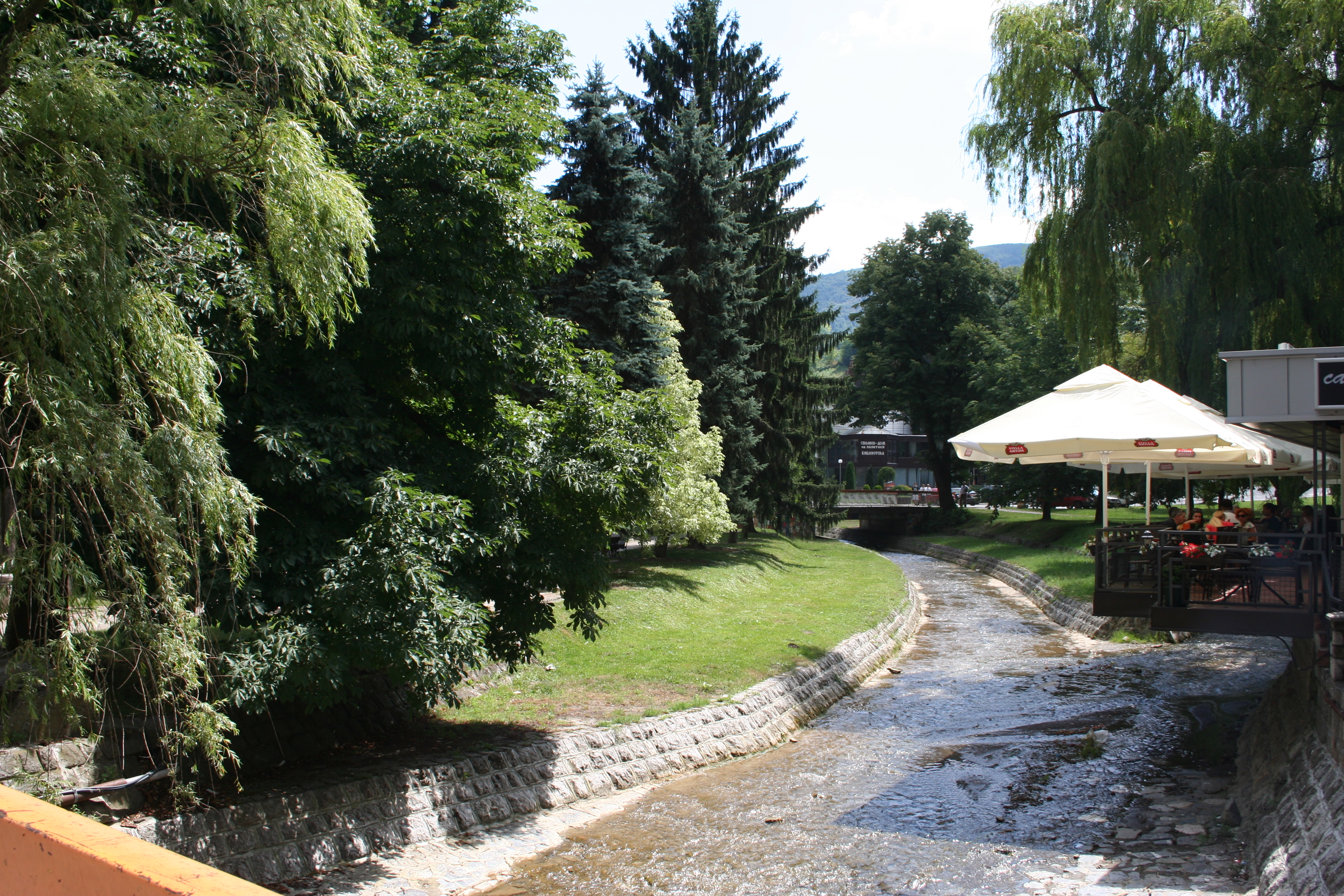
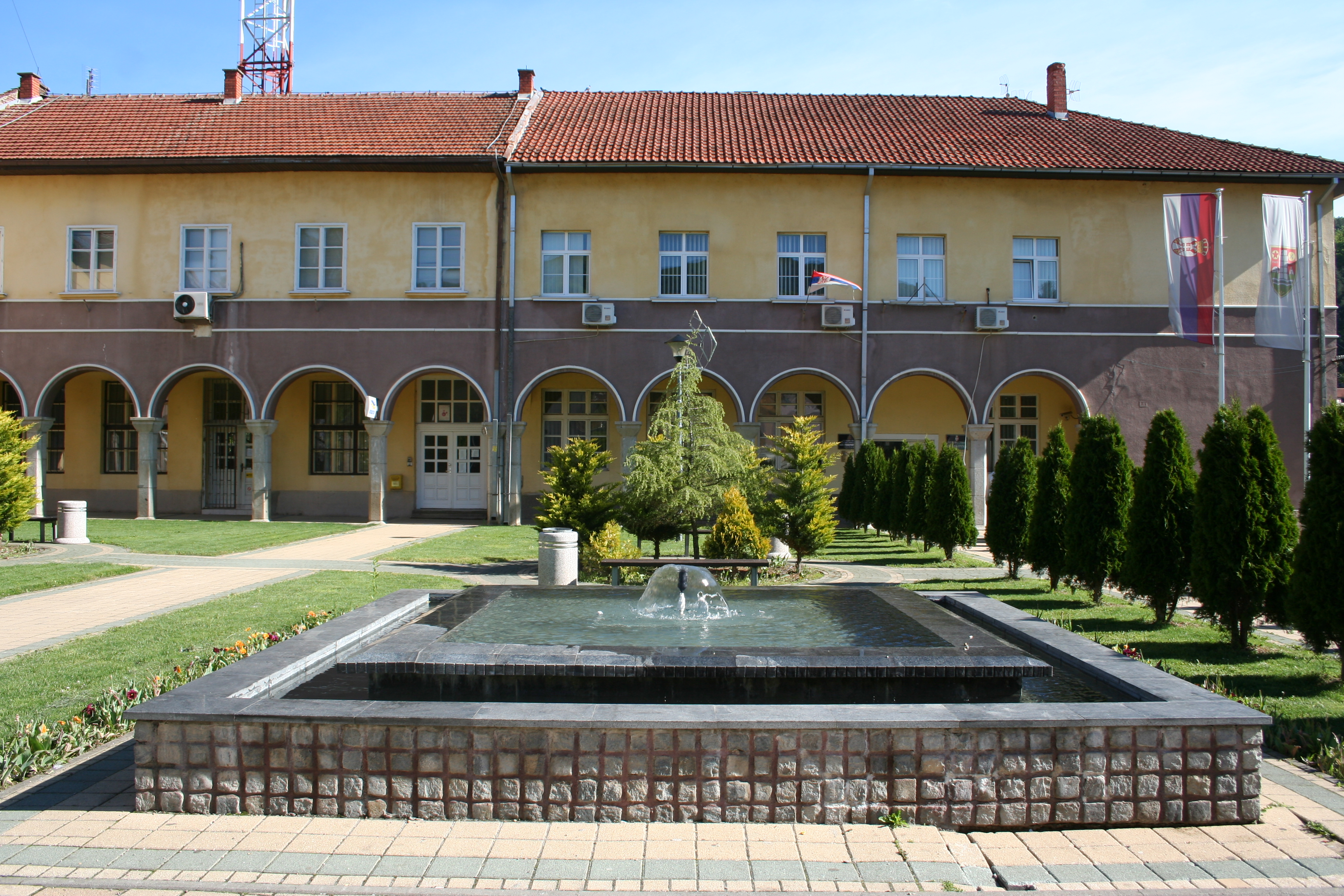
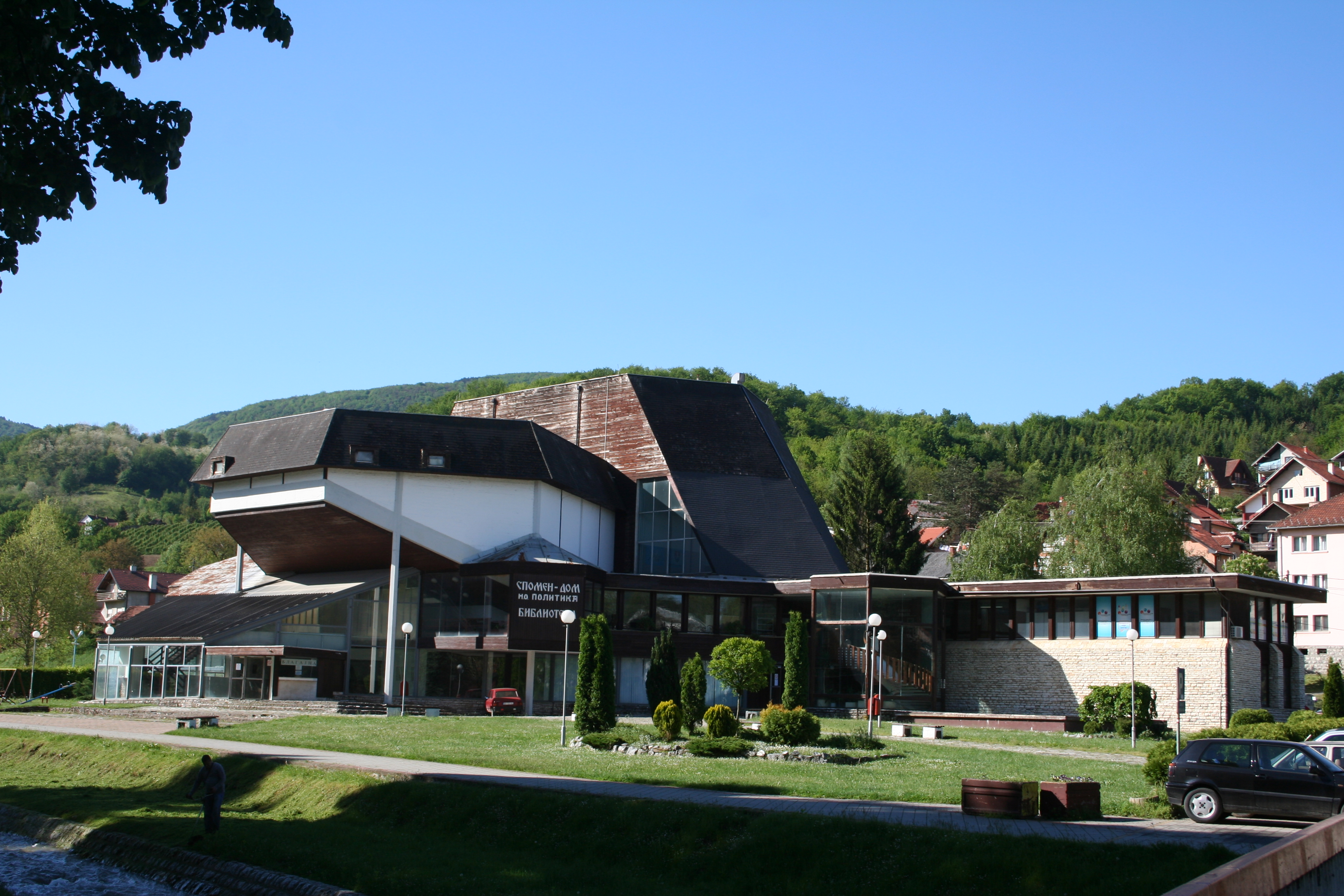
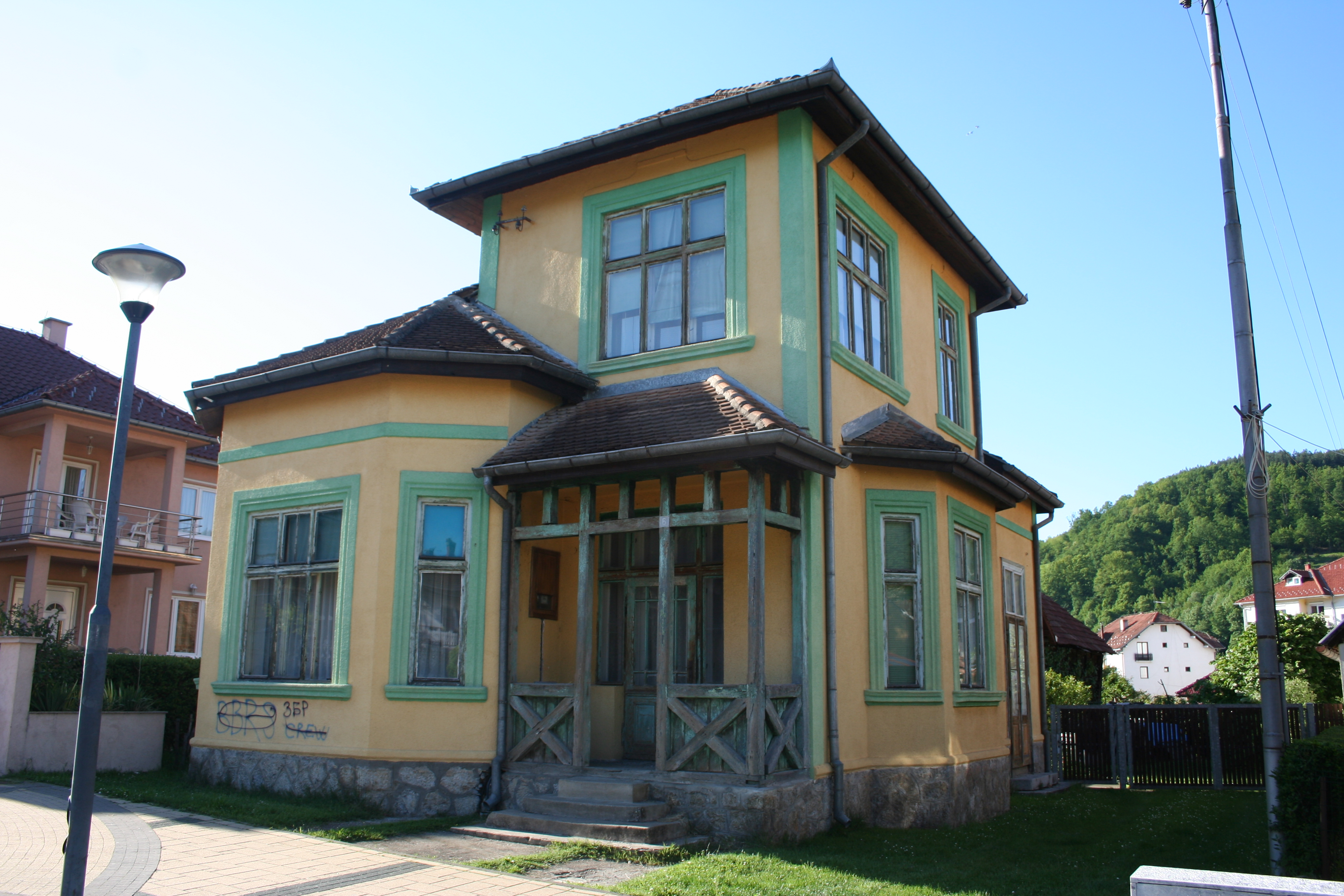
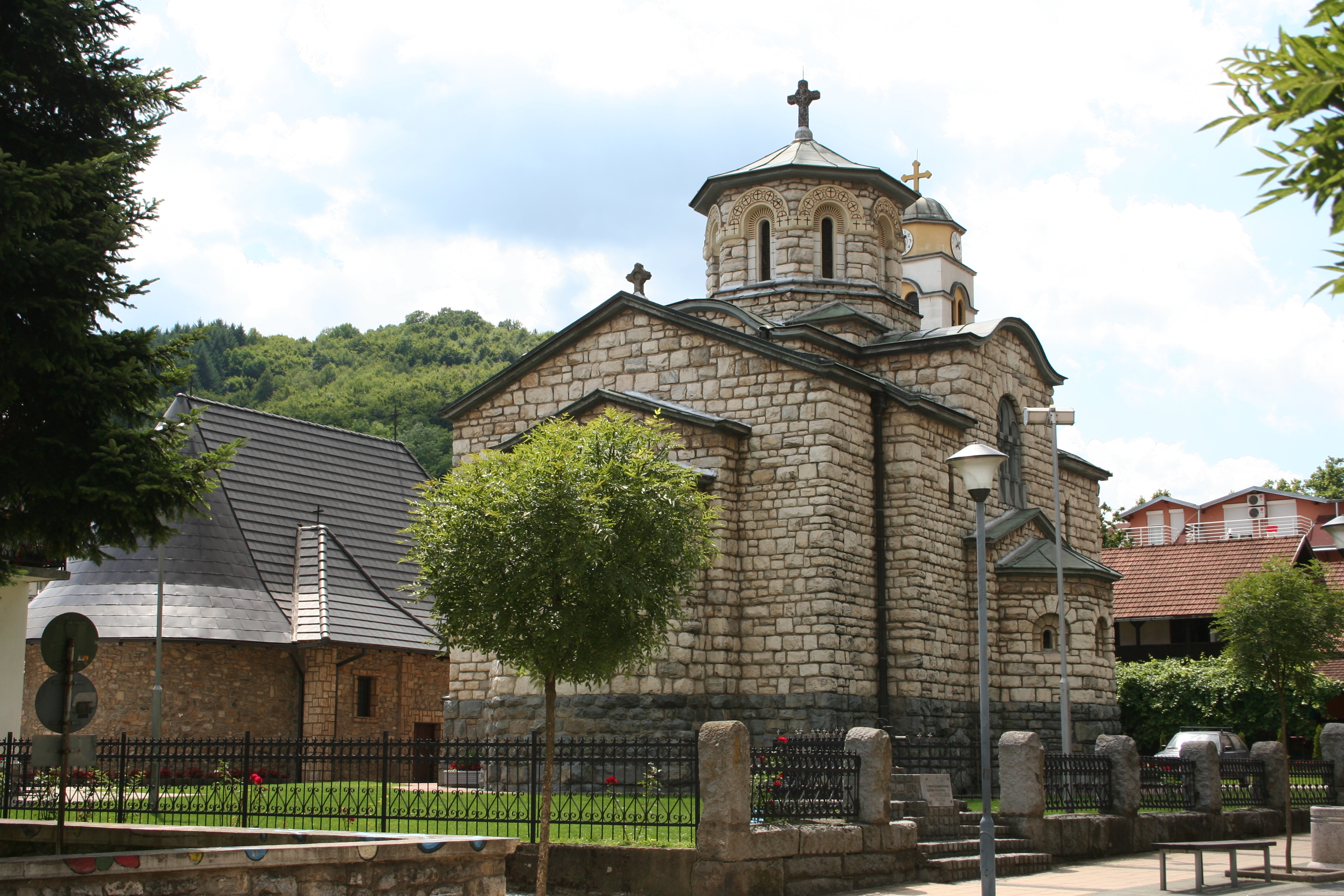
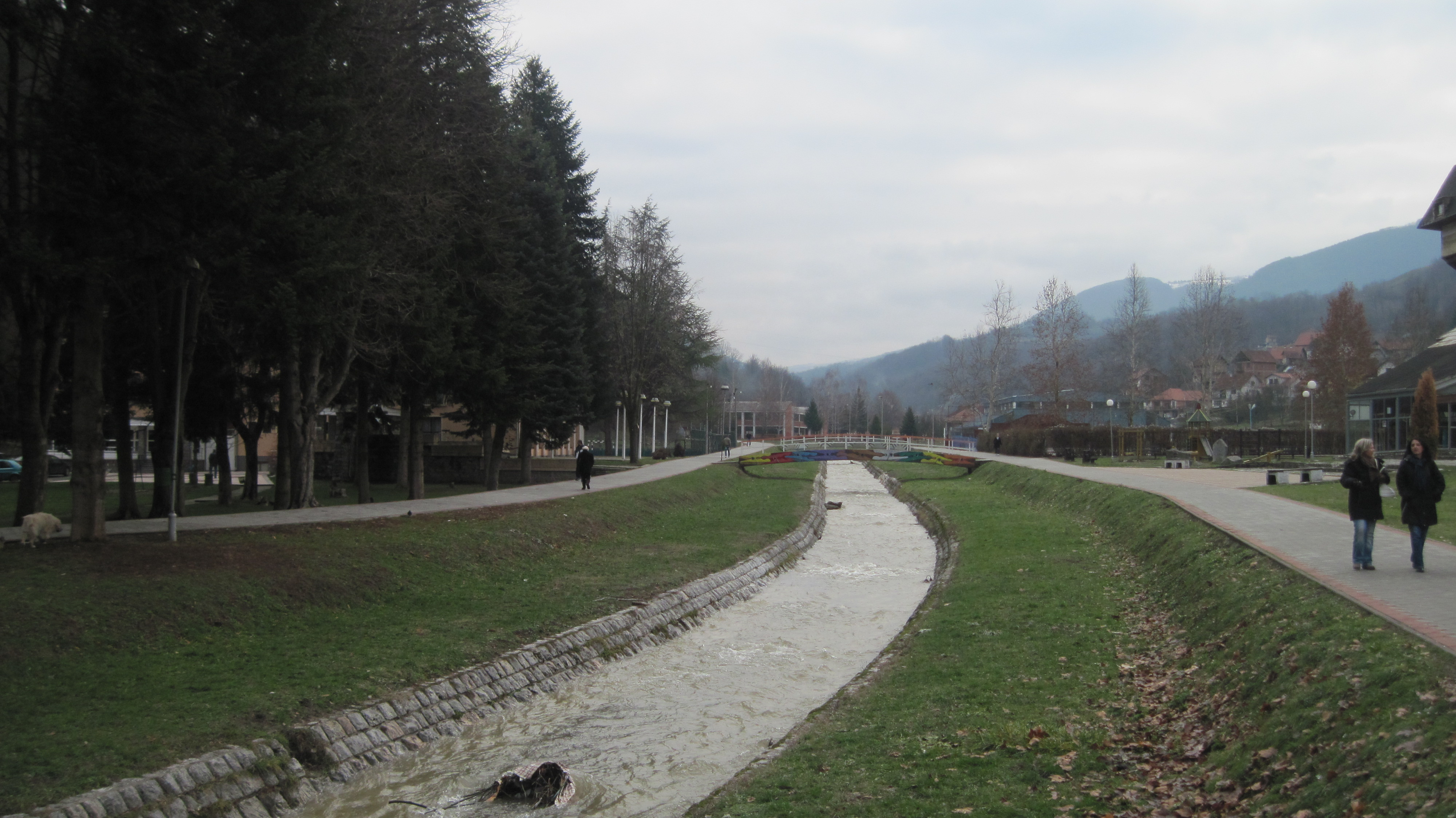
- Krupanj

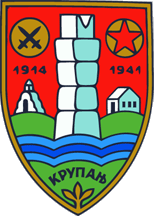
- Coat of arms

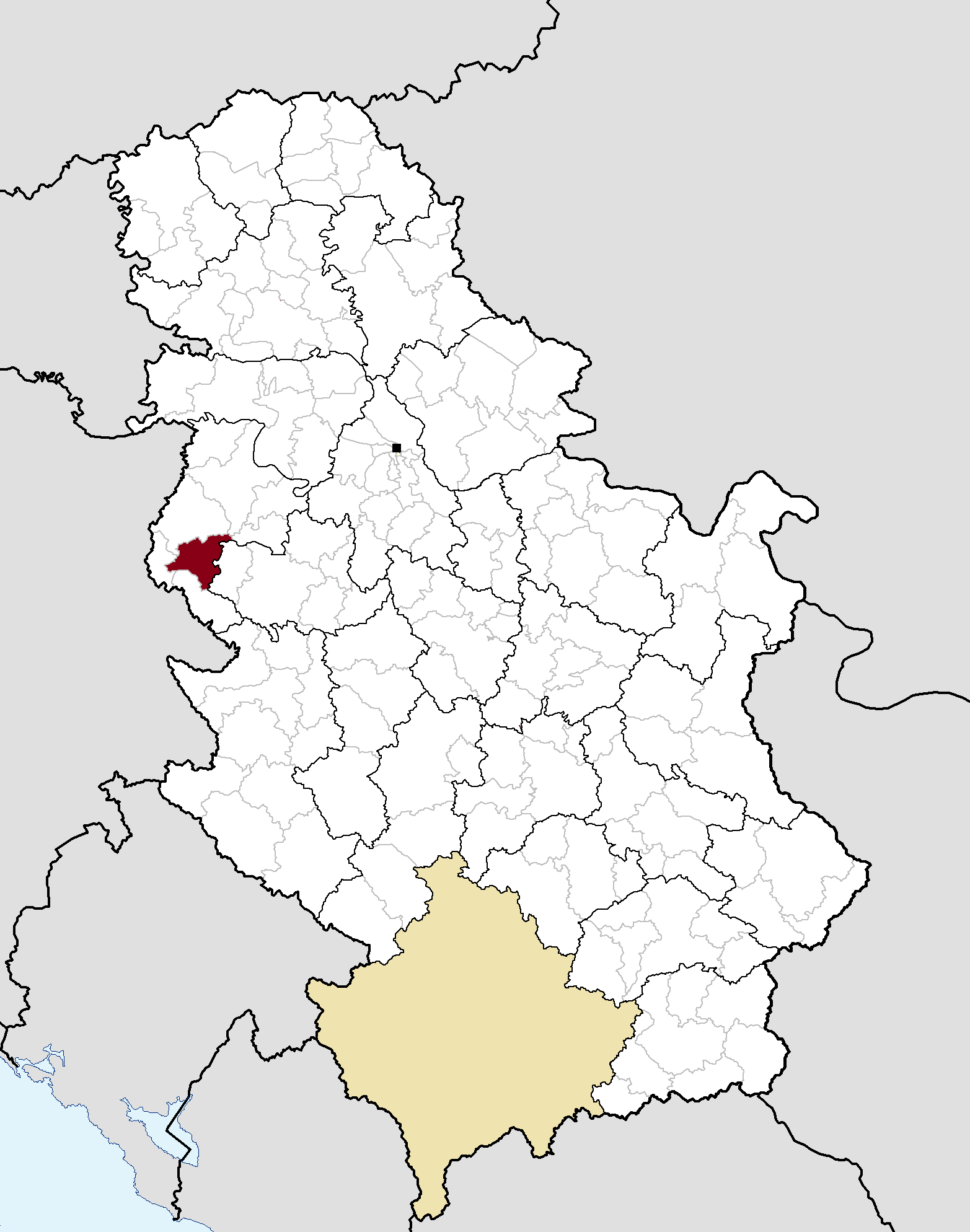
- Location of the municipality of Krupanj within Serbia
- Coordinates: 44°22′N 19°22′E
- Country: Serbia
- Region: Šumadija and Western Serbia
- District: Mačva
- Settlements: 23

Government
  - Mayor: Mladen Stefanović (SNS)

Area
  - Town: 3.96 km^{2} (1.53 sq mi)
  - Municipality: 342 km^{2} (132 sq mi)
- Elevation: 299 m (981 ft)

Population (2022 census)
  - Town: 4,134
  - Town density: 1,040/km^{2} (2,700/sq mi)
  - Municipality: 14,399
  - Municipality density: 42.1/km^{2} (109/sq mi)
- Time zone: UTC+1 (CET)
  - Summer (DST): UTC+2 (CEST)
- Postal code: 15314
- Area code: +381(0)15
- Car plates: LO
- Website: www.krupanj.org.rs

Krupanj (Serbian Cyrillic: Крупањ, pronounced [krûːpaɲ]) is a town and municipality located in the Mačva District of western Serbia. The municipality has a total population of 14,399 inhabitants, while the town has a population of 4,134 inhabitants (2022 census). It is the center of the historical region of Rađevina.

== Geography ==
The town lies in western Serbia, at the southern border of the Pannonian plain and Mačva region. It is surrounded by the mountains Jagodnja, Boranja and Sokolska planina, in a valley intersected by several rivers and creeks. In the town itself, the rivers Bogoštica, Čađavica and Kržava conjoin into Likodra, which later empties into Jadar. The town lies at the altitude of 280 m.

The municipality area covers around 242 km^{2} (93.44 sq mi), and it encompasses 23 villages. It is the center of the region Rađevina, which was named after Rađ, a knight of Prince Lazar, who defended it from Hungarian and Ottoman conquerors, and who is buried at the monument of Rađev Kamen.

== Settlements ==
Aside from the town of Krupanj, the municipality includes the following settlements:

- Banjevac
- Bela Crkva
- Bogoštica
- Brezovice
- Brštica
- Cerova
- Cvetulja
- Dvorska
- Kostajnik
- Krasava
- Kržava
- Likodra
- Lipenović
- Mojković
- Planina
- Ravnaja
- Šljivova
- Stave
- Tolisavac
- Tomanj
- Vrbić
- Zavlaka

== History ==
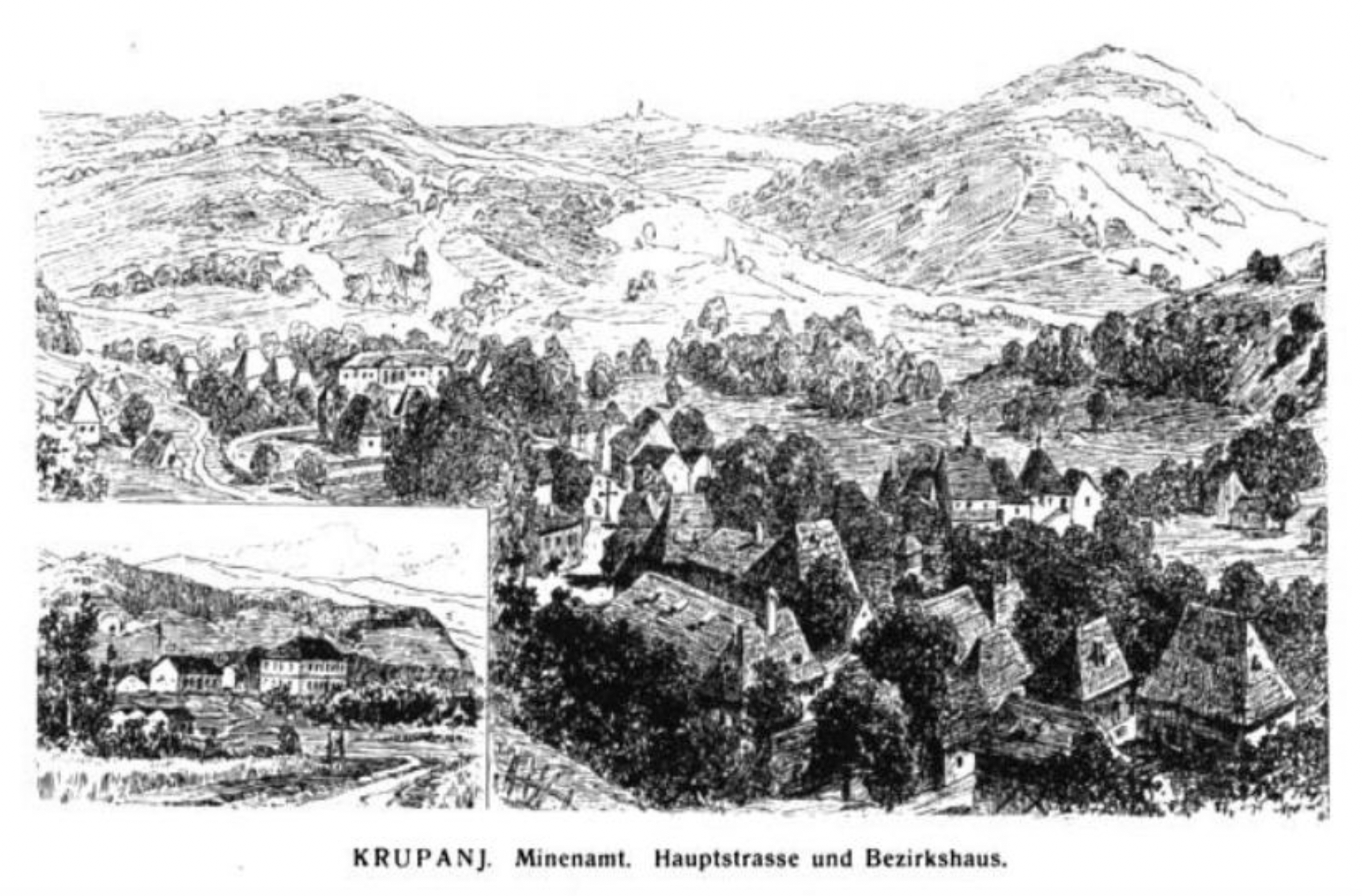
Krupanj in the 1860s

The area of Krupanj includes archaeological sites, such as a Roman-era settlement in the lower part of the town. There are stećci (medieval tombstones) scattered all over Krupanj, many which have bas-reliefs with motifs of the Branković dynasty. Krupanj (Latin: Crupagn, Crupan, Chrupagn) was a mining town of the medieval Serbian state and was settled by Ragusans and had a Catholic church; its oldest mention is from 1417. At the time, it was a silver mining site, frequented by Ragusan merchant caravans. Lead ore with a high content of silver was excavated at the Postenje and Jagodnja, and then transported across the Drina river, where it was melted in Srebrenica, which was a major silver processing center in the Balkans. This process also gave name to both settlements: larger lumps of ore were called "krupa" (hence, Krupanj) while the Serbian word for silver is "srebro" (Srebrenica). After the Ottoman conquest of the Serbian Despotate in 1459, Krupanj was organized into the Sanjak of Zvornik. The town was razed by the Ottomans and then rebuilt from scratch.

In the 16th–17th centuries, Krupanj was an Ottoman mining town with a market. In the 1528 defter the only Orthodox church in the area was that in Dobri Potok. In the beginning of the 17th century it was mentioned as a kadilik centre and kasaba, with a population of predominantly ethnic Serbs.

At the end of the 17th and early 18th centuries there were Austro-Turkish wars that led to the Austrian conquest of the area and establishment of the Kingdom of Serbia (1718–1739). Krupanj became one of 18 districts of Serbia (as the German: Kruppanier District). Serbia was returned to the Ottoman Empire in 1739. In 1784 the Austrian spy Jovan Peretić travelled parts of Serbia and described Krupanj as having 60 wooden houses in bad shape and a wooden mosque. During the Austro-Turkish War (1788–1791), the area was liberated by general Chernel and Serbian Free Corps under Vujadinović in October 1789. In 1791, Krupanj and Rađevina were returned to Ottoman rule. In the First Serbian Uprising (1804–1813), Rađevina and neighbouring Jadar first rose up in July 1804 under hajduk harambaša Đorđe Ćurčija and was caught up in rebel operations, with Krupanj being liberated. The knez of Rađevina, Krsta Ignjatović, and his son, vojvoda (general) Maksim Krstić, defended Krupanj and Rađevina until the suppression of the uprising in 1813.

The Jadar-Rađevina nahiya was ceded to the Principality of Serbia with the 1833 hatt-i sharif (edict) of Sultan Mahmud II. After 1833, Rađevina was a srez in the Podrinje okrug of Serbia with 34 villages and the small town (varošica) Krupanj as seat. The first basic school in the town was opened in 1837, and the church of Holy Ascension was built in 1842. The Ottomans ultimately withdrew in 1862, and the nearby fortress called "Soko Grad" was torn down, to be turned into the monastery of St. Nicholas.

New, intensive mining period began in 1870, and lasted up to the 1960s. Focus was shifted to antimony, while production of zinc, silver, sulfur and iron ultimately failed. At the end of the 19th century, a lead-antimony smeltery was founded in the city. During World War I, a battle between Austria-Hungary and Serbian forces was fought at the nearby site of Mačkov kamen, the peak of Jagodnja mountain. A charnel house or memorial church is built in memory of the event 1930 when the bones of both Serbian soldier and Austrian aggressors were buried in the same ossuary.

Town's hospital was donated by the benefactor Nikola Spasić, Daily Politika donated the cultural center, in memory of its founders, brothers Darko F. Ribnikar and Vladislav F. Ribnikar, who were both killed in action in this area, fighting off Austro-Hungarian invading forces in 1914, during World War I. There are also court building, police building and hotel "Borac".

During World War II, in the village of Bela Crkva, partisan Žikica Jovanović Španac killed two gendarmes on 7 July 1941, which would become the official date of celebration of the people's uprising against occupiers in Serbia during communist rule. On 26 September 1941, a meeting of partisans' main headquarters, presided by Josip Broz Tito, was held in the nearby village of Stolice. A monument and memorial park were built after the war, celebrating the event. As the town was one of the centers of the Republic of Užice, it was burned to the ground by German occupiers in late 1941, with only a few buildings surviving.

During the war, antimony mining in Krupanj reached a peak, as German occupational forces pushed the smeltery to the maximum. Not counting the sickness, local population had no benefits from antimony production, before or after the war. Instead, they were mostly employed in agriculture, husbandry and forestry. The especially produced plums, which as prunes were exported even to the United States. Some 30,000 cubic metres (1,100,000 cu ft) of wood yearly would be collected from the Boranja mountain.

In the second half of the 20th century, all mining activity ceased. Founded in 1957 in Loznica, cellulose "Viskoza" factory became one of the largest companies in western Serbia by the 1980s. Several companies in connection to factory were founded in time in Krupanj. After the collapse of "Viskoza" in the 1990s, all industrial activity in Krupanj halted also. By the early 2020s, operational were only few micro-companies in wood industry, and one small textile factory, founded in the late 2010s.

Krupanj was affected by significant flooding in May 2014. Many houses, roads and a bridge were completely destroyed.

== Economy ==
The following table gives a preview of total number of employed people per their core activity (as of 2017):

Activity	Total
Agriculture, forestry and fishing	37
Mining	19
Processing industry	652
Distribution of power, gas and water	19
Distribution of water and water waste management	34
Construction	241
Wholesale and retail, repair	348
Traffic, storage and communication	144
Hotels and restaurants	91
Media and telecommunications	17
Finance and insurance	10
Property stock and charter	2
Professional, scientific, innovative and technical activities	48
Administrative and other services	14
Administration and social assurance	169
Education	243
Healthcare and social work	125
Art, leisure and recreation	25
Other services	62
Total	2,301

== Sports ==
Local football club FK Rađevac have competed in the third tier of Serbia's football pyramid.

== Tourism ==
There are two hotels in the town center. The Church of Good Creek is a preserved building of traditional sacral architecture. Several historical monuments from the World Wars include the ones at Stolice, Mačkov kamen and Cer mountain. The monastery of Tronoša and the ethno-park in nearby Tršić preserve the memory of Vuk Stefanović Karadžić, a 19th-century reformer of the Serbian language.

At the site of Mačkov kamen there is also a small ski resort. The area has some hiking and biking, and the creeks are rich in fish, especially trout; there is an organized fishing ground at the site of Zmajevac. Several sporting grounds (including a sports hall and Olympic-sized open swimming pool) offer support for sports tourism, used by sport clubs from Serbia and nearby countries.

A religious, three-part ethno-complex of Dobri Potok Church Park is built in the linden forest north of Krupanj, including the Church of the Feast of the Ascension. Forming of the complex began in 1987, though some edifices are much older, and some are in town itself. The lower, Mother of God Park includes the Church of the Dormition of the Mother of God (mentioned in 1528) with belfry and vault, a museum, paintings gallery and reception venue. Close to it is the underground Church of Saint Procopius in the former mining shaft, jointly with mining, pedagogic, hunting and beekeeping exhibitions. There is also a church dedicated to the Jugović brothers and a drinking fountain. The upper, Saint Sava Park, there is another underground church, dedicated to Saint Paraskeva, and the reconstructed village household from the 19th century. The third is a recreational Park of Archdeacon Stephen. Museum "Old Mansion" with a restaurant is in downtown Krupanj.

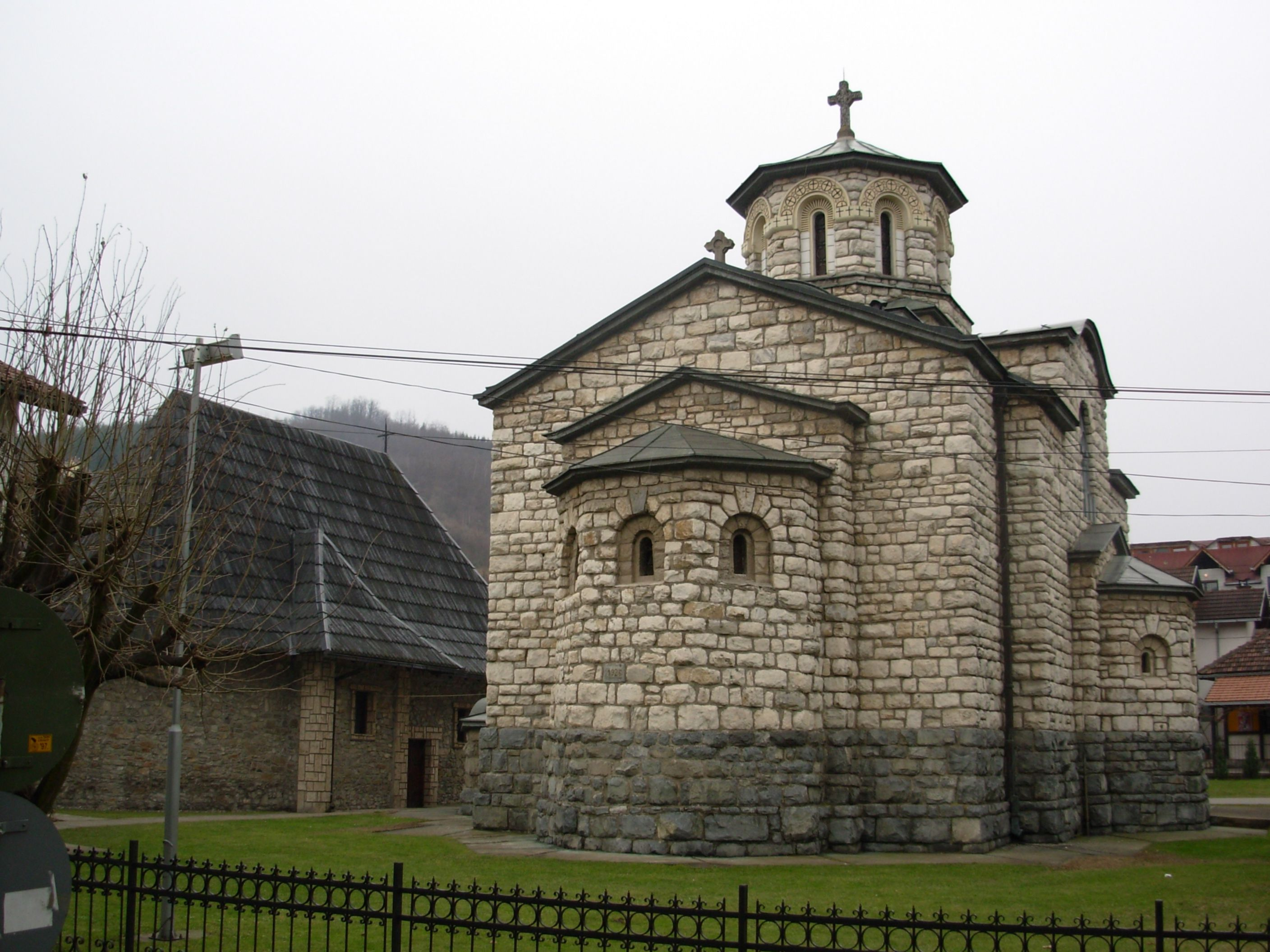
Church of Holy Ascension in the town center

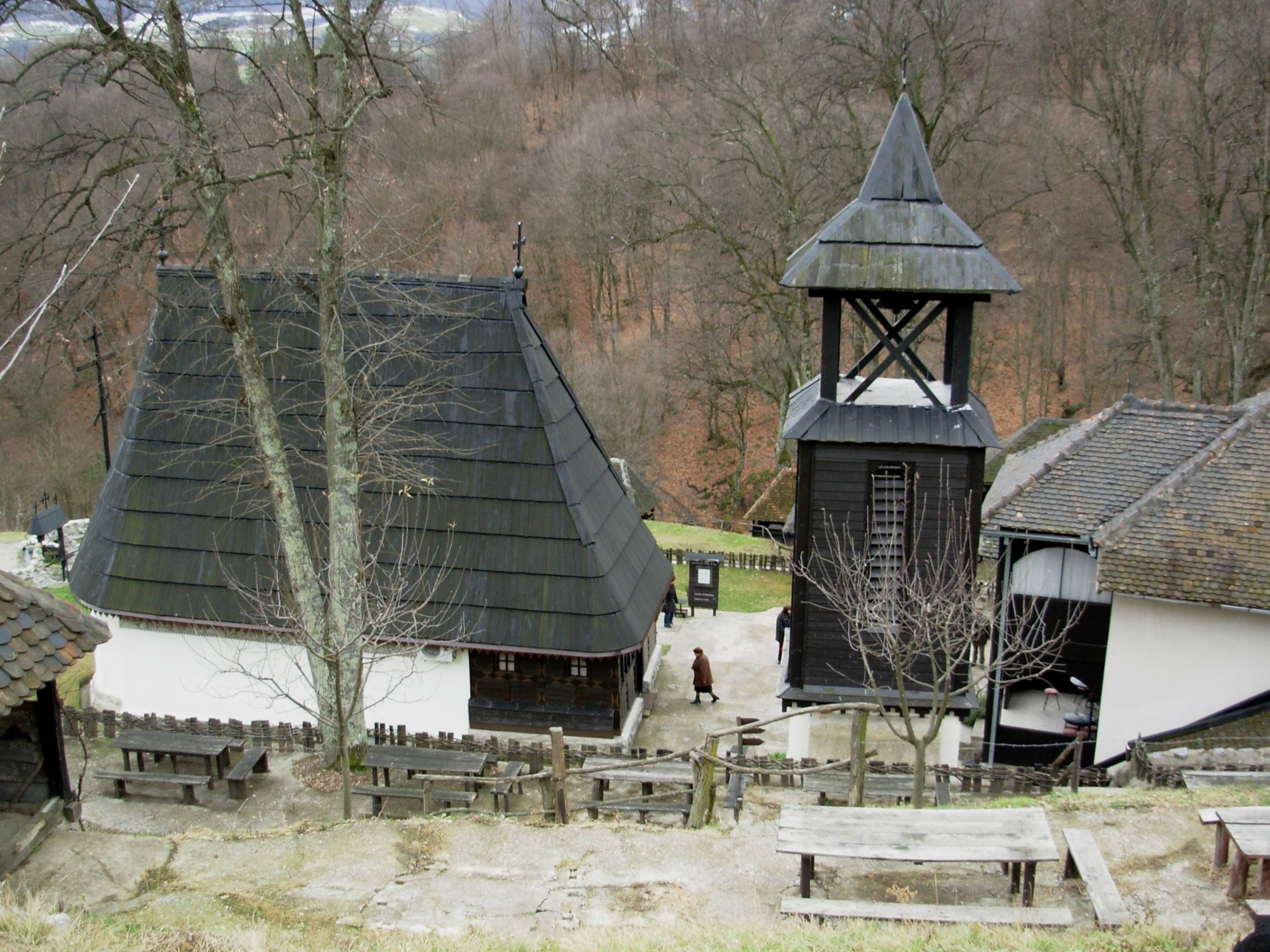
Good Creek Church at the town outskirts

== Demographics ==
Historical population
Year	Pop.	±% p.a.
1948	24,123	—
1953	25,396	+1.03%
1961	24,520	−0.44%
1971	23,529	−0.41%
1981	22,530	−0.43%
1991	21,879	−0.29%
2002	20,192	−0.73%
2011	17,295	−1.71%
2022	14,399	−1.65%

According to the 2011 census results, the municipality had a population of 17,295 inhabitants, of which a majority were ethnic Serbs (96.15%). The municipality had a total population of 14,399 inhabitants, while the town has a population of 4,134 inhabitants according to the 2022 census.

== See also ==
- Mačva District
- Podrinje
- Church of Holy Ascension, Krupanj

== Sources ==
- Đurđev, Aleksandar (2001) [1997], "Историјски развој Крупња", Цркве Крупња [Churches of Krupanj], Janus; Rastko
- Đurđev, Aleksandar (1988). Рађевина: Обичаји, веровања и народно стваралаштво. Дом културе „Политика“, Крупањ – via Rastko.rs.
- Pantelić, Dobrivoje & Dobrila (28 May 2017), "Dubrovčani dolazili po srebro", Politika-Magazin No. 1026 (in Serbian), pp. 24–25
- Ristanović, Slobodan (1971). Ustanička Rađevina: prilozi za hroniku. Istorijski arhiv.
