= Brštica =

Coordinates: 44°23′30.12″N 19°20′08.16″E

- Village (Selo)
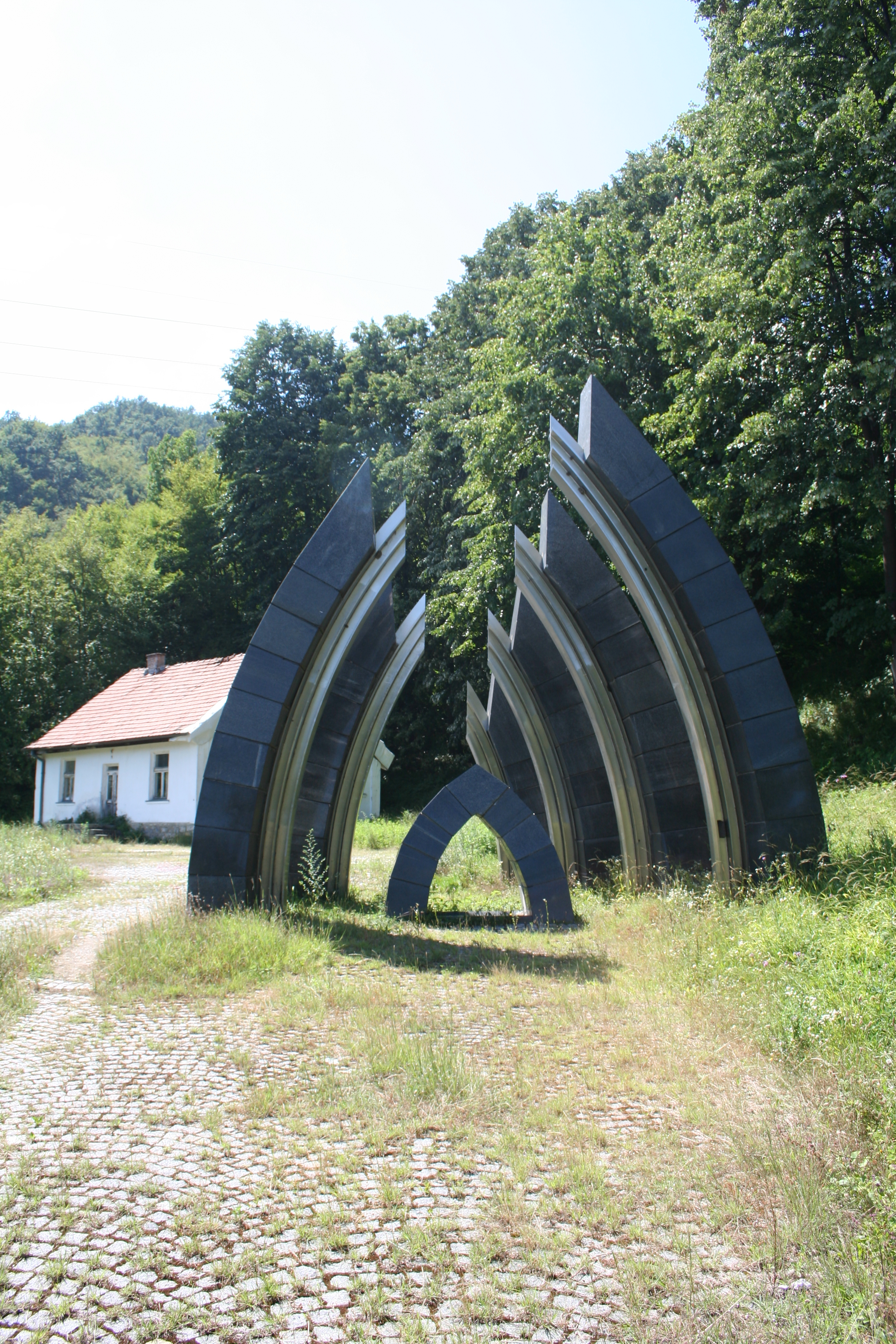

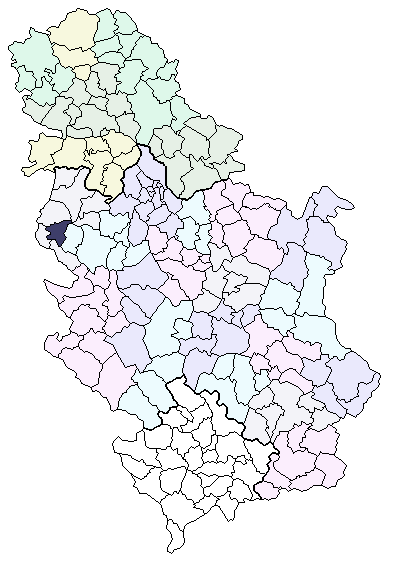
- Country: Serbia
- District: Mačva District
- Municipality: Krupanj
- Time zone: UTC+1 (CET)
  - Summer (DST): UTC+2 (CEST)

Brštica (Serbian Cyrillic: Брштица) is a village in Serbia. It is situated in the Krupanj municipality in Central Serbia. The village had a Serb ethnic majority and a population of 1,254 in 2002.

== Historical population ==
- 1948: 1,080
- 1953: 1,213
- 1961: 1,352
- 1971: 1,222
- 1981: 1,186
- 1991: 1,243
- 2002: 1,254

== See also ==
- List of places in Serbia
- Stolice, a notable part of Brštica
