= Dvorska, Serbia =

Dvorska Дворска
- Village (Selo)
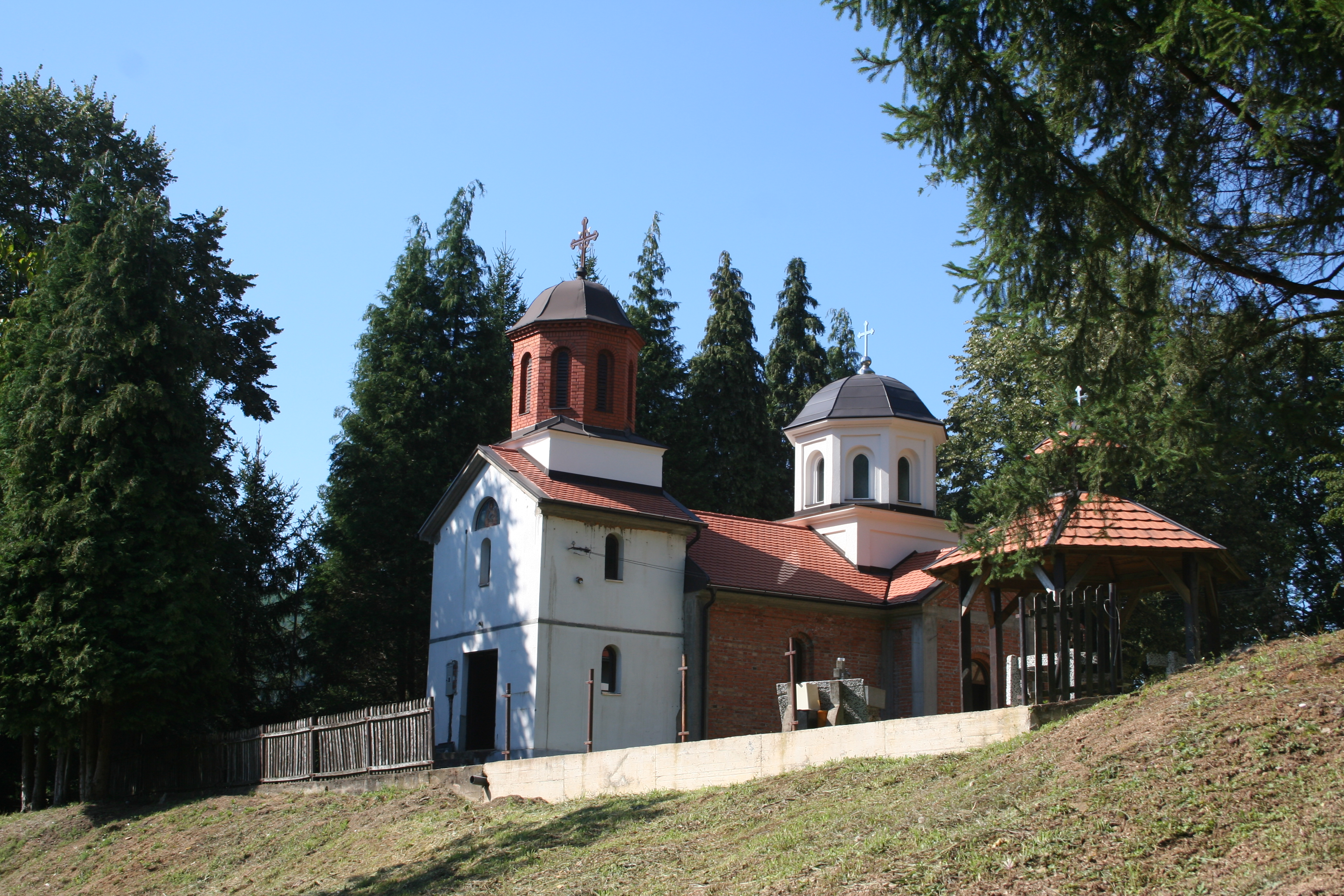

- Location within Serbia
- Coordinates: 44°26′6″N 19°21′57″E
- Country: Serbia
- District: Mačva District
- Municipality: Krupanj

Population (2002)
  - Total: 1,064
- Time zone: UTC+1 (CET)
  - Summer (DST): UTC+2 (CEST)

Dvorska is a village in the municipality of Krupanj, Serbia. According to the 2002 census, the village has a population of 1064 people.
