= Likodra (village) =

- Village
- Interactive map of Likodra
- Coordinates: 44°24′6″N 19°26′59″E
- Country: Serbia
- District: Mačva District
- Municipality: Krupanj

Population (2002)
  - Total: 874
- Time zone: UTC+1 (CET)
  - Summer (DST): UTC+2 (CEST)

Likodra is a village in the municipality of Krupanj, Serbia. It had a population of 874 at the 2002 census.
