= Alexis Dworsky =

German conceptual artist and cultural scientist

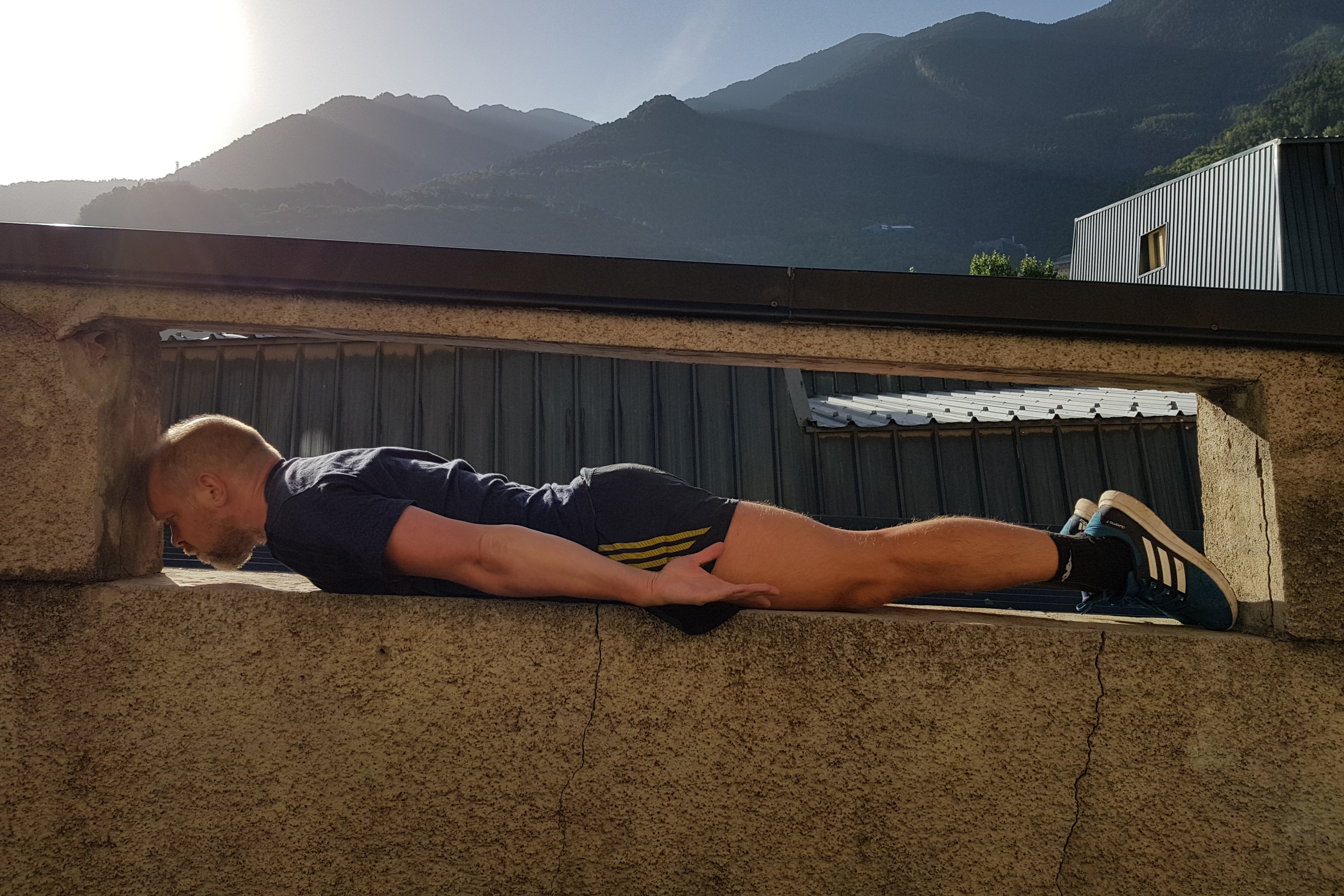
Alexis Dworsky performing with the urban architecture

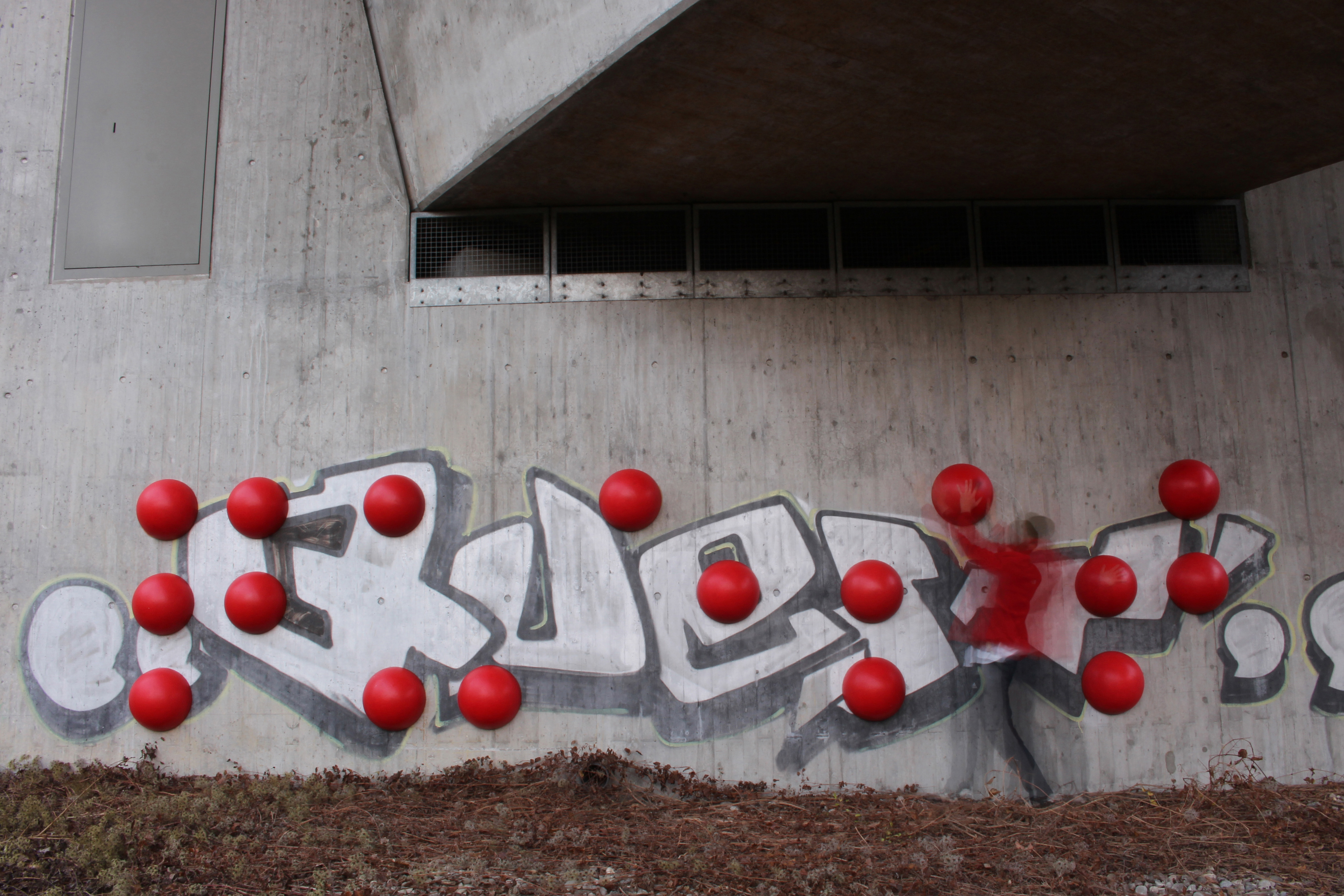
Braille Graffiti: series of interventions in public space

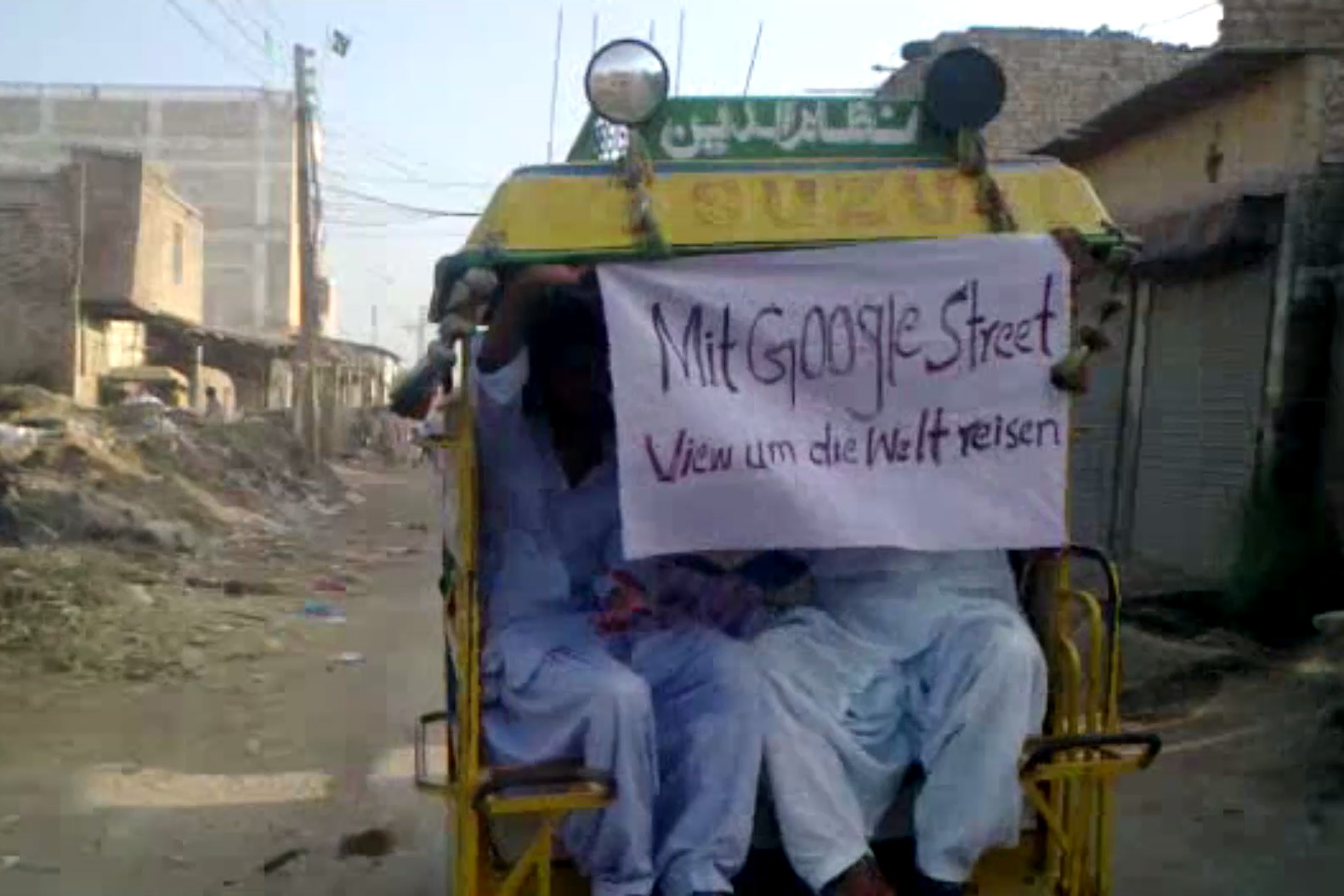
Travelling around the world by Google Street View: The adventures of his virtual journeys Dworsky transforms into lecture performances and slide shows.

Alexis Dworsky is a conceptual artist, cultural scientist and professor at the University of Arts Linz. He performs artistic research that combines practical and theoretical approaches.

== Biography ==
Dworsky initially studied landscape architecture at the Technical University of Munich, followed by studies at the Academy of Fine Arts in Munich with Res Ingold. Dworsky received his doctorate in 2011 from Bazon Brock in aesthetics at the University of Wuppertal on the cultural history of the dinosaur. From 2001 to 2007, Dworsky was a curator in the art space Lothringer13, Munich. From 2012 to 2018, he was a teacher at the Academy of Fine Arts in Munich. Alexis Dworsky is the professor of media design at the University of Arts Linz since 2021.

Dworsky works as a freelance artist, cultural scientist and curator. In particular, Dworsky works in and about the public space. A peculiarity of Dworsky’s approach is also to regard the digital-media space as a public space.

== Curation and research ==
The boundary between art, research and curation is becoming increasingly blurred in Dworsky's work, for example because he also shows works by other artists at exhibitions, or invites them to events and lectures, researches the background, writes scientific texts about them and also publishes them. For example, Alexis Dworsky curated an exhibition by Forensic Architecture.

== Exhibitions, interventions and performances (selection) ==
- 2021 3D prints and screening at the exhibition Mäusebunker & Hygieneinstitut in the IUAV di Venezia on the occasion of the Venice Biennale of Architecture
- 2019 Fitte Kadenz, performative choreography as part of the programme Up in Arms of the nGbK, Berlin
- 2018 Word, an exhibition and workshop at kult gallery, Singapore; made possible by the Goethe-Institut Singapore
- 2018: Urban Playground, a discursive exhibition at the MaximiliansForum, Munich
- 2017: Braille Style, installations in public space, exhibition in the Cultural Center Panteón, lecture and workshop, at the invitation of the Goethe-Institut Mexico, Mexico City
- 2017: Urban Trimm Dich!, installation of a temporary fitness trail with a program at the Candidplatz, Munich
- Since 2014: Graffiti for the blind, a series of installations in public spaces
- 2012: Science meets Dharma, symposium with Tibetan monks, Western scientists, and the artist Alexis Dworsky at the Dalai Lama Institute of Higher Education, Bangalore, India
- 2011: Hartu eta Eman. Discursos y Recursos, an exhibition at the Sala América, Vitoria-Gasteiz
- 2004: Conspiracy – nichts ist wie es scheint!!!, an exhibition project on conspiracy theories with the sociologist Anne Hacket at the Lothringer13

== Prizes and awards ==
- 2020, 2021 Artist-in-residence grant at the Urban Nation, Berlin
- 2017: Competition Public Art of the City of Munich
- 2016: Interdisciplinary Art Prize zwei:eins
- 2013: Scholarship FreiFarben (FreeColors), Schafhof - Europäisches Künstlerhaus Oberbayern
- 2011: Project scholarship Junge Kunst / Neue Medien (Young Art / New Media) by the city of Munich
- 2010: Europäisches Kunststipendium Oberbayern (European Art Scholarship Upper Bavaria), artist-in-residence in the Basque Country

== Publications ==
- Dinosaurier! Die Kulturgeschichte, Wilhelm Fink Verlag, Paderborn 2011 ISBN 978-3-7705-5222-1 (in German, English summary)
- Weiße Kaninchen, rote Pillen / White Rabbits, Red Pills, Kerber Verlag, Bielefeld 2015 ISBN 978-3-7356-0088-2 (in German and English)
- (Post)Urbane Kapriolen / Escapades in Public Space, Munich 2018 ISBN 978-3-00-059367-3 (in German and English, PDF)
- Numerous international essays, such as "In between Dinosaurs" in Interdisciplinary Science Reviews
