= Battles of Podrinje (1804) =

- Part of First Serbian Uprising
- Location: Sanjak of Zvornik, Ottoman Empire
- Commanded by: Đorđe Ćurčija (Serbian rebels); Ali Bey Vidajić (Ottoman Bosnian)
- Objective: Liberation of Jadar and Rađevina and stopping Ottoman Bosnian military aid to the Dahije.; Securing Podrinje and aiding Dahije.
- Date: July–September 1804
- Executed by: Ćurčija's hajduk army, Jadar and Rađevina rebels, Šabac nahija army, Valjevo nahija hajduks.; Sanjak of Zvornik army, Janissaries.
- Outcome: Truce, Jadar and Rađevina left in the hands of the new administration of the Sanjak of Zvornik, on conditions.

The Battles of Podrinje were fought in July–August 1804 by the Drina river between the Serbian rebels under the command of hajduk (brigand) Đorđe Ćurčija and Ottoman Bosnian army under the command of Ali Bey Vidajić, an ayan of the Sanjak of Zvornik. The Serbian rebels sought to liberate Jadar and Rađevina and stopping Ottoman Bosnian military aid to the renegade Janissaries in the Belgrade Pashalik known as the Dahije, against whom the Serbian rebels rose up against in February following the Slaughter of the Knezes and years of tyrannical rule. Ali Bey was a close friend of the Dahije and imitated their abusive system in Podrinje (the Drina river area). After several battles which ultimately left the Serbian side of the Drina in rebel hands, the Ottoman government made changes in the Ottoman Bosnian administration and the new pasha of Zvornik, Mehmed-paša Vidajić, the uncle and rival of Ali Bey, agreed on truce with the Podrinje Serbs. Jadar and Rađevina were left in the hands of the Sanjak of Zvornik for the time being, until new Serbian rebel campaigns.

== Background ==
The Serbian Podrinje area (the right side of the Drina river, including Jadar and Rađevina) was administratively part of the Sanjak of Zvornik (and Bosnia Eyalet), and was governed by Ali Bey Vidajić, an ayan based in Zvornik, a close friend and supporter of the renegade Janissary leaders known as the Dahije in the Sanjak of Smederevo ("Belgrade Pashalik"). Ali Bey imitated the Dahije's system in his area, and imposed chiftliks both in Bosnia and the Serbian Podrinje. The Vidajić ayan family ruled from Zvornik, and while Ali Bey was a follower of the Dahije, another member of the family, kaptan (fortress captain) Mehmed Bey Vidajić, the paternal uncle of Ali, was a supporter of Sultan Selim III. Selim III began reforms via Belgrade Vizier Hadji Mustafa Pasha (t. 1793–1801), but Mustafa Pasha was killed by the Dahije in 1801, after which the Dahije wrested total power in the Belgrade Pashalik and ruled in tyranny.

The uprising against the Dahije broke out in the Belgrade Pashalik in February 1804, while Jadar and Rađevina (in Serbian Podrinje) were part of the Sanjak of Zvornik. The Serb-inhabited Osat region across the Drina (left, Bosnian side) was held by Hadji Sali Bey of Srebrenica, who was an opponent of the Dahije due to an earlier conflict with Dahije leader Aganlija regarding Azbukovica (in Serbian Podrinje). The archpriest Matija Nenadović worked on gaining the trust of Hadji Sali Bey. In the beginning, rebel leader Karađorđe sought to limit operations to the Belgrade Pashalik, and Jadar and Rađevina remained outside missions, until the right moment presented itself to adjoin these areas.

The Dahije were supported by Ali Bey Vidajić and Bosnian troops against the Serbian rebels that attacked the towns of Valjevo and Šabac in springtime 1804. With the outbreak of the uprising, Karađorđe sent emissaries to Sarajevo to deter support to the Dahije, while the Dahije sent Mus-aga, the brother of Dahije leader Mehmed-aga Fočić, to gain support. Ibrahim Bey Vidajić, another member of the family, was at Constantinople where he also informed the Porte about the Dahije abuse on Serbs. The Dahije gained the support of Sarajevan notable Ahmet Agha Kadribegović who mustered men, while Karađorđe bribed Sarajevan notables Delčić, Veškadić and Pobrić with a large number of ducats to not join the Dahije, and ensured them that the Serbs were not revolting against Sultan Selim III.

In June 1804, Karađorđe designed a plan to liberate a large part of the Bosnia Eyalet, east of the Pliva and Vrbas rivers. He sent emissaries to Bosnia proper and Herzegovina. In Bosnia, relations with Serbia were particularly strong in eastern Bosnia, by the Drina, also due to a large number of the population in West Serbia stemmed from there. Apart from Orthodox-majority areas in Podrinje, Karađorđe had serious plans about conquering Sarajevo as well.

== History ==
=== Ali Bey's truce with Jadar and Rađevina ===
Ali Bey Vidajić, who also held land tenure (spahiluk) in Jadar and Rađevina, called the kmets (serfs) of Jadar and Rađevina to come with Krsta Ignjatović, the knez of Rađevina, to his tower at Pilice across the Drina. He told them that any rebels of those areas would be sentenced to death, and appointed the serf Anta Bogićević his boluk-bashi (captain) to ensure order in Jadar and Rađevina and carry out executions of rebels and criminals. Anta accepted on the conditions that Turks from Krupanj, Loznica and Lipnica never enter and disturb Serb villages and that Ali Bey's army never cross Jadar and Rađevina to fight the Serbian rebels, both cases resulting in the disturbance of the areas. Ali Bey gave his word.

Upon returning to Jadar and Rađevina, Anta immediately secretly met with knezes and notables such as Jevta Čotrić of Tršić, Kuzman of Nedeljice, Sima Stanešević of Slatina, Damjan Milić of Stupnica, Trivun of Runjani, Arsen Školja of Badanja, and Tešan of Korenita, whom he tasked with readying and carefully arming the people for uprising, awaiting the call of Karađorđe. He secretly met with vojvoda (general) Jakov Nenadović, the main rebel leader in the Valjevo nahiya, regarding this. The notables of Jadar and Rađevina swore oath to ready for uprising and to keep it a secret. Jakov thanked Anta for ensuring that the area from the Žiča river to Soko was not used by the Ottoman Bosnian army across the Drina against the Serbian rebels, and that he therefore did not need to put up trenches and sentinels towards Jadar and Rađevina.

=== Ćurčija's campaign ===
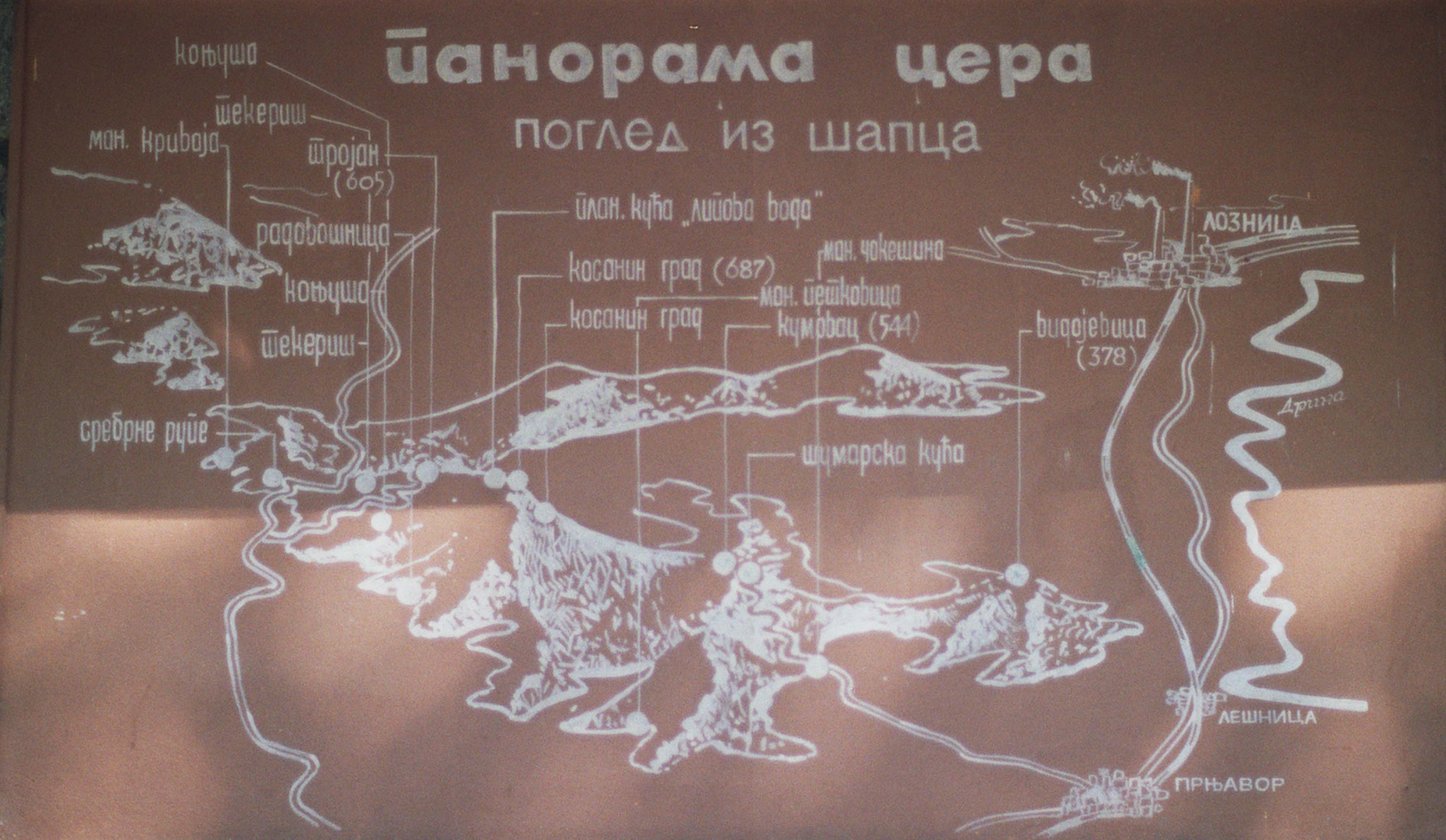
Cer mountain (with Čokešina and Vidojevica), Loznica and Lešnica, from the viewpoint of Šabac (in Serbian).

On 26 June [O.S. 14 June] 1804, the hajduk harambaša Đorđe Ćurčija, quarreling with Serbian generals and falling out with supreme leader Karađorđe following the takeover of Požarevac in late May, decided to go to Šabac and Mačva where he removed the administration put there by Jakov Nenadović and appointed his own people. From Mačva, Ćurčija raided Podrinje (part of the Sanjak of Zvornik) and rose the Serbs of the region. In Jadar, hajduk Todor Bojinović from Gornji Dobrić, hajduk Sima Sarić from Cikote, Gavrilo Caklen from Jadranska Lešnica, and monk Đunisije of the Tronoša monastery untimely (for Anta's and Jakov's plans) rallied people who supported immediate rebellion, and called Anta a "Turk bootlicker" and slandered him to Karađorđe. Ćurčija crossed the Cer mountain into Jadar on 14 July [O.S. 2 July] 1804 or 15 July, and dispersed Turks from the area, and burnt down Ottoman mansions, including Ali Bey's mansions in Šurice where he killed the Turks that stayed there. After Šurice, Ćurčija ordered Sarić and barjaktar (flag-bearer) Petar with other momci ("fellows") to move via the left bank of the Jadar and attack Loznica, while Bojinović was sent via the right bank on Lešnica, and he himself went for Krupanj in Rađevina. The archpriest and rebel leader Matija Nenadović wrote in his Memoirs how Ćurčija took over Mačva and refused to join the main camp at Vračar (in the Belgrade blockade), saying that he "protected the border" and armed the people.

Sarić went via Tršić and entered an empty Loznica, the Turks all having left for Bosnia hearing of the approaching rebels or fearing the same fate as Šurice, so Loznica was taken without a fight. Ćurčija killed many of the emigrating Loznica Turks after intercepting them via Gučevo. Sarić looted Loznica and left hegumen Melentije of Tronoša in place of the kadi (judge) and harambaša Mitar Tufegdžija in place of the mütesellim (civil governor). Sarić then went to Smrdan near Koviljača, and after some time descended towards the Drina where he dug trenches to defend from incoming Ottoman Bosnian troops. Bojinović dispered the Turks from Lešnica after a hard battle, and then camped at the Ranitovača forest. Ćurčija dispersed the Turks from Krupanj (or it was abandoned ahead for Soko and Bosnia), after which he rose all of Rađevina, appointing chiefs (glavari) and band commanders (četobaša), and handed out ammunition in Jadar. At Krupanj, Ćurčija appointed knez Krsta as the starešina (chief), who built a sconce above the town. The expulsion of Muslims from Podrinje put fear into Bosnian Muslims.

Serbian Podrinje was now in rebel hands, and Ali Bey mustered a large army. When news came of Ottoman Bosnian mustering at Zvornik, Ćurčija ordered his rebels to gather at Koviljača for better monitoring. Ćurčija then ordered the burning of Loznica if it was impossible to defend, and went to Rađevina where he handed out ammunition. At first, Loznica had 500–600 rebel defenders, but this number decreased to 200 at the Koviljača camp after rebels went home with spoils or to settle personal affairs. As to trick the Zvornik army they were greater in numbers, the Serbian rebels lit three camp bonfires each. Bojinović punished deserters in his ranks, and killed some of the disobedient. As one of Ćurčija's buljubaša, Bojinović held the right bank of the Jadar.

Ali Bey sent his army in two detachments, to Lešnica and Loznica, with the first crossing the Drina at night and attacked Bojinović in the Ranitovača forest, taking control of the area, choosing to do so instead of clashing with Ćurčija's force. After the tough battle, Bojinović retreated to Vidojevica, where he requested support from Ćurčija. Hearing of the arrival of the Ottoman Bosnian army, the Koviljača camp panicked and many dispersed. The barjaktar Petar sent some men to burn down Loznica and took the remainder of the camp to Tršić, numbering 100 men, who were joined by around 100 men from the Valjevo nahiya under the command of hajduk Mihailo Nedić. Nedić was the brother of the fallen hajduk leaders at Čokešina. Petar and Mihailo decided to attack the Bosnian army at Loznica, with the infantry led by Ćurčija's hajduk Jovan Timotić attacking from the mountain and the cavalry attacking from the plain. The rebel cavalry met a Bosnian cavalry ten times larger, on noble horses, and fearing encirclement, they dispersed. The infantry had entered the Christian neighbourhood where they were encircled and lost 80 men, not knowing the cavalry had retreated. The rest of Ćurčija's rebels had gathered at Tršić, from where Nedić ordered them to flee across the Cer mountain. The Ottoman Bosnian army camping at Loznica now daily entered Serb villages which they burnt down and looted. The only real resistance was from Ćurčija's hajduk force, which also tried but failed to defend the Jarebica church from being burnt down. Ali Bey thus managed to retake Loznica and Lešnica quickly and without hassle. The rebels sent all weak and women into refuges (zbegove) in the Cer mountain.

Ćurčija went from Rađevina to Jadar and gathered rebels at Simino Brdo (near Cikote, between Jarebica and Krupanj), joined by priest Luka Lazarević and Milovan Grbović, bringing the gathered to a total of 3,000. The rebels were still far less than the Bosnian troops in Loznica. On 18 August [O.S. 6 August] 1804 (Feast of the Transfiguration), the Ottoman Bosnian army headed for Šabac, so the rebel army descended Pocerina, but the Bosnian army avoided a battle by retreating across the Drina into Bosnia. The rebel army camped at Čokešina, where Ćurčija's brother Jovan warned him that Jakov Nenadović planned to kill him, but Ćurčija didn't believe it, and scolded Jovan. Ćurčija called the Mačva knezes and kmets to explain their whereabouts when the Bosnian army freely moved in the area, and fearing for their lives, these sent elderly and destitute to meet with him, which enraged him. Ćurčija had a quarrel with Luka Lazarević, with Luka defending the Mačvans and then leaving with his men. Ćurčija and Grbović camped at Turska Lipnica and ordered the Mačvans to bring flour to Loznica, Ćurčija's men burning down Lipnica and Loznica and then camped at Klupci. The Mačvans brought flour, but Ćurčija's rebel army decreased to 300 after a couple of days, most going home, and Ćurčija and Grbović then camped with their men at Tršić. In all this time, it was mostly the force under Ćurčija's command that successfully fought the Ottoman Bosnian troops. Batalaka (1793–1869) described Ćurčija's endeavor as "from all his work, nothing would come of it, because he did everything without thinking, without any good calculated and measured plan". Ćurčija was not yet an able general, and had insufficient troops to succeed.

During the battles in Podrinje, Mus-aga Fočić had collected cavalrymen in Bosnia and was joined by Janissary agha Bego Novljanin, and they crossed the Drina unnoticed into Mačva and arrived at Šabac on 18 August [O.S. 6 August] 1804, where Mus-aga dug up his hidden ducats and beheaded more than 70 Serbs then retreated to Bosnia. Mus-aga's force numbered 1,000, and was also accompanied by Ali Bey and Poreč-Alija, the former mütesellim of Valjevo. Ilija Srdan's band managed to kill a few of Mus-aga's men in an ambush by the road outside Prnjavor. Ćurčija's hajduks didn't notice Mus-aga's incursion, and Jakov used this to slander Ćurčija while at Vračar with Karađorđe and other generals, claiming Ćurčija had sold Jadar and Mačva, received coin for letting Mus-aga go to Šabac, that he was a thief and bandit. Ćurčija had a bad reputation due to some of his men stealing from the people. Jakov was especially angry at Ćurčija for taking over the administration in Mačva and kicking out Jakov's trusted men.

For his administrative reorganization in Mačva, and the view that he was held accountable for Mus-aga's breakthrough to Šabac, the rebel leadership sentenced Đorđe Ćurčija to death, with Jakov entrusted to kick out Ćurčija's hajduks and bring order in all of Mačva. Jakov Nenadović and Sima Marković of the Belgrade nahiya were sent from Vračar to Mačva, with 1,200 men, to carry out the sentence, meeting with Ćurčija on the premise of discussing the future defense of Mačva and Jadar, with their men shooting him at Novo Selo near Loznica. Jakov had also had Ćurčija's brother and 30 men killed in the Šabac nahiya, with the rest of Ćurčija's men either swore allegiance to Jakov or left for other areas. Now, Jakov governed Mačva and Pocerina, while Jadar was left to Anta Bogićević and Jevta Čotrić to govern. The polyglot Vuk Karadžić (1787–1864), who was the scribe of Ćurčija at the time, wrote that Ćurčija died due to "other generals' vanity", especially Jakov's, and that he wasn't a villain as they portrayed him. The rebel operations in Jadar and Rađevina stopped with the death of Ćurčija in autumn.

=== Mehmed Bey's truce and Bekir Pasha's mission ===
After the battles in Podrinje, there were changes in the state administration in the Bosnia Eyalet, favouring the Porte and weakening the Janissaries, which was reflected in the Sanjak of Zvornik. The Podrinje area came under the administration of 70-year-old Mehmed Bey Vidajić, the paternal uncle and rival of Ali Bey. Mehmed entered negotiations with the Podrinje Serbs regarding support against Janissaries and abolishing the chiflik system imposed by Ali Bey. Anta Bogićević and Jevta Čotrić reluctantly accepted the agreement, which meant securing Serbian Podrinje from Bosnian attacks, the abolishment of Janissary chifliks, tribute collected by Anta and Čotrić to Mehmed, prohibition of Turks to enter Serb villages and the Bosnian army to cross Serbian Podrinje, and local Serb judicial matters separated from Ottoman involvement; the two sides agreed on peace and exchanged hostages. Although Serbian Podrinje stayed outside Serbian rebel administration, it was convenient for the Serbian rebels in the Belgrade Pashalik as it stopped Ottoman Bosnian incursions via that area.

In November 1804, it seemed that peace would be possible due to Bekir Pasha's claimed support to pass along the Serbian demands to the Porte, however, in December, due to strained relations in the borders, Bekir Pasha was ordered by the sultan to quell the Serbian uprising. Bekir Pasha ordered for the mobilization of the Bosnia Eyalet against the Serbian rebels.

== Aftermath ==
The situation in Šabac intensified at the end of 1804, and the rebel army under Jakov Nenadović besieged Šabac. The rebels clashed with the Ottoman Bosnian army in Podrinje throughout 1805.

== See also ==
- Timeline of the Serbian Revolution
- Serbian Army (revolutionary)

== Annotations ==
1. The events are known in historiography as "Rebellion in Jadar and Rađevina" (buna u Jadru i Rađevini), "Conflicts between the Serbs and Turks in Podrinje" (sukobi Srba i Turaka po Podrinju). K. Protić included the events in the chapter "Embryo of the uprising in Podrinje" (Zametak ustanka u Podrinju), and sub-chapters "Battles and conflicts with the Turks in Podrinje" (Bojevi i sukobi s Turcima u Podrinju, na Šuricama, na Krupnju, na Loznici i na Lješnici) and "Ceasefire in Podrinje" (Primirje u Podrinju).

== Sources ==
- Batalaka, Lazar Arsenijević (1898). Историја српског устанка, део први [History of the Serbian Uprising: Part One]. Vol. I. Izd. Batalakinoga fonda – via Google Books.
- Đurđev, Aleksandar (2001) [1997], "Историјски развој Крупња", Цркве Крупња [Churches of Krupanj], Janus; Rastko
- Hrabak, Bogumil (1996). "Ваљевци у почетним годинама првог српског устанка" (PDF). Гласник Историјског архива Ваљево. 30. Istorijski arhiv Valjevo.
- Ilić, Mikica (15 February 2017). "Đorđe Obradović – Ćurčija, Karađorđev ustanik iz Bosuta". M novine (791). Sremska Mitrovica: 35–41 – via Academia.edu.
- Obradović, Stojan (1873). Живот и радња заслужних Срба из окружија шабачког и подринског у књажеству Србији у устанцима противу насиља турског од 1804. и 1815. године: у два одељка. Stefanović.
- Protić, Kosta (1893). "Ратни догађаји из првога српског устанка под Карађорђем Петровићем 1804—1813". Годишњица Николе Чупића. XIII. Državna štamparija.
- Stojkanović, Cvetko (2009). Сто годину Цркве у Црвици и развој духовног живота у Осату. Bajina Bašta. ISBN 978-86-88031-01-1.
- Teinović, Bratislav (2020). "Преглед српско-турског ратовања на Дрини (1804-1815)" (PDF). Војноисторијски гласник. 2. Институт за стратегијска истраживања: 9–35.
- Teinović, Bratislav (2018a). "Босански ејалет у првим годинама Првог српског устанка (1804–1806)" [The Eyalet of Bosnia in the first years on The First Serbian Uprising (1804–1806)]. Зборник Матице српске за историју. 97. Матица српска.
- Teinović, Bratislav (2018b). "U trouglu velikih sila: Bosna i Hercegovina tokom Prvog srpskog ustanka (1804–1813)". Svarog (17). Nezavisni univerzitet Banja Luka: 43–55 – via CEEOL.
