= Milić Kedić =

Serbian commander (1775–1809)

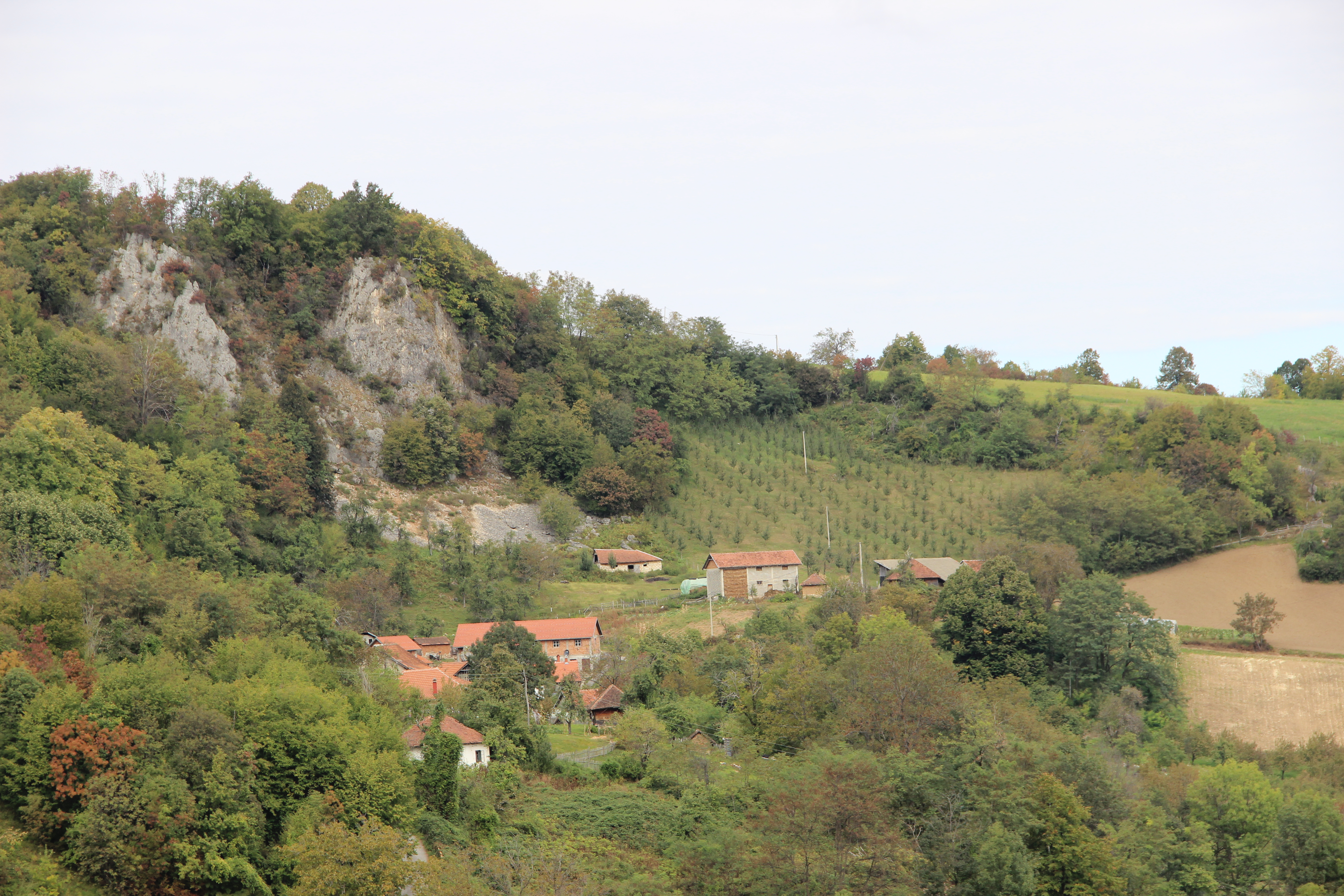
- View of Suvodanje, Kedić's home village
- Born: 1775; Suvodanje, Sanjak of Smederevo, Ottoman Empire
- Died: 7 May 1809 (aged 33–34); Rožanj, Revolutionary Serbia
- Cause of death: †
- Children: Dimitrije Kedić
- Military career
- Allegiance: Revolutionary Serbia
- Service years: 1804–1809
- Rank: buljubaša, vojvoda
- Units: Valjevo nahija army; Podgorina
- Commands: Valjevo area, Drina frontier
- Known for: commander in Valjevo nahija and Drina frontier

Milić Kedić (Serbian: Милић Кедић; 1775–1809) was a Serbian commander in the area of Valjevo and Podrinje in the First Serbian Uprising (1804–13). He was usually part of the Valjevo army of the Nenadović family. He was killed in action.

== Early life ==
Kedić was born in the village of Suvodanje in the Valjevo nahiya.

Kedić was a momak ("lad") of Ilija Birčanin, the knez (mayor) of the knežina (Christian self-governing village group) of Podgorina during the tenure of Vizier Hadji Mustafa Pasha. Birčanin closely worked with knez of Brankovina Aleksa Nenadović and knez of Kolubara Nikola Grbović, a trio which held assemblies together and collected taxes for the Vizier and protected their villagers from Turk oppression and injustice. Serbian knezes served in a militia that protected the Sanjak of Smederevo ("Belgrade Pashalik") from renegade Janissaries in the 1790s; Kedić was a buljubaša (captain) under the command of Birčanin. The renegade Janissaries (known as the "Dahije") took over the Pashalik in 1801 and killed the Vizier.

Aleksa had written a letter to Austrian officer Paul von Mitesser in Zemun regarding plans for an uprising against the Dahije, which they however intercepted. The Dahije now set out to murder chosen notable Serbs. Dahije leader Mehmed-aga Fočić sent for Aleksa, Birčanin and Grbović to ready lodging and food for a hunt. Birčanin's momak ("lad") Milić Kedić suggested that he take an entourage with him but he declined, as it would show Fočić that he did not trust him. Aleksa, Birčanin and Nikola Grbović's son Milovan were captured and imprisoned. A payment for their release was negotiated but Fočić had Aleksa and Birčanin executed and their heads put on display. Milić Kedić took Birčanin's body to be buried at the Ćelije Monastery. The Dahije killed many notable Serbs in the event known as the "Slaughter of the Knezes", which triggered the First Serbian Uprising.

Milić Kedić succeeded Birčanin as knez of Podgorina after Birčanin's brother declined, and was sanctioned by Fočić.

== Revolution ==
Valjevo nahiya leaders Jakov Nenadović and archpriest Matija Nenadović, the brother and son of Aleksa, respectively, gathered 700 men at the Brankovina hill on 27 February [O.S. 15 February] 1804 and called upon Nikola Grbović and Milić Kedić to join them and avenge the knezes. They immediately gathered men from their knežina and went for Valjevo, with Kedić and Milivoje Tadić setting camp southwest of the town at the Vrana hill. Kedić and Tadić took the Brđani hill while Grbović went to Žuber to the east of the town. Nenadović's army set up northeast of the town towards the Vrana hill where Kedić now was based. Grbović and Matija Nenadović discussed the operation on 11 March [O.S. 28 February] 1804 at Pošare, and on his way back, Grbović had chardaks, hay and straws outside the town lit on fire. Kedić saw the smoke in the evening and believed that the siege had begun, and entered the town from the south while Tadić descended Brđani into the town. They set Turk houses on fire and entered combat, upon which Grbović and Matija Nenadović attacked from their sides. The Turks fortified themselves in a stone courtyard but decided that they couldn't withstand the attack, and in the morning escaped through the western side, and went for Bosnia. Jakov destroyed a reinforcement at Svileuva and then besieged Šabac. Kedić protected the Valjevo nahija from reinforcements from Soko while Grbović protected it from Užice. The Dahije were supported by captain Ali-paša Vidajić of the Sanjak of Zvornik against the Serbs that attacked the towns of Valjevo and Šabac in springtime 1804.

In 1805 Kedić served under vojvoda Jakov and participated in the siege of Užice, in which he attacked from the western side at Ponikve. They burnt the town (varoš) and 5,000 houses, forcing the Turks to surrender by 1 August [O.S. 20 July] 1805. The sultan ordered the Viziers of Bosnia in 1805 to muster armies to attack Serbia, and they crossed the Drina and attacked Valjevo and Šabac in late January 1806. In 1806 he and Milovan Grbović were in Jakov's army and fought at Čučuge against Osman-Džora's 6,000 men, the rebels managing to decimate that force by 2,800 men. The rest of the Ottoman force fled towards the Drina, pursued by units under the command of Kedić, Milovan Grbović and buljubaša Mihailo Nedić, which killed off most of them. In July 1806 he and Milovan fought at Bukovica and Bratačić against Hadji Bey, who lost many men and was pursued across the Drina. He next fought in several skirmishes around the Drina, in Bratačić, Baurić, Ljubovija, Rađevo polje, Rožanj near Soko. He was saved by the Valjevo nahiya army from an encirclement at Rožanj. Milovan became ill at Rožanj and died at home.

Kedić accompanied the Nenadović in the Bosnian campaign, fighting at Sikirić, Vrankovine, Soko in Gračanica, and in 1809 at Pribićevac above Srebrenica. While taking over the Turk trench at Pribićevac, he was seriously wounded and taken to Rožanj where he died on 7 May [O.S. 25 April] 1809. His burial place is unknown.

He was physically described as of middle height, slim with wide shoulders, intense eyes, and had a large moustache. By character, he was serious and heroic. His son Dimitrije, aged 18–19, succeeded him as vojvoda of Podgorina, appointed by Karađorđe.

== See also ==
- Serbian Army (revolutionary)
- List of Serbian Revolutionaries
- Timeline of the Serbian Revolution

== Sources ==
- Batalaka, Lazar Arsenijević (1898). Историја српског устанка. Vol. I. Izd. Batalakinoga fonda.
- Milićević, Milan Đ. (1888). Поменик знаменитих људи у српског народа новијега доба. Издање Чупићеве задужбине – via Archive.org.
- Nenadović, Konstantin N. (1903) [1883]. Живот и дела великог Ђорђа Петровића Кара-Ђорђа. Vol. I (2 ed.). Belgrade: Штампа Савића и Комп. – via Archive.org.
- Nenadović, Konstantin N. (1884). Живот и дела великог Ђорђа Петровића Кара-Ђорђа. Vol. II (1 ed.). Vienna: У Штампарији Јована Н. Вернаја – via Google Books.
- Protić, Kosta (1893). "Ратни догађаји из првога српског устанка под Карађорђем Петровићем 1804—1813". Годишњица Николе Чупића. XIII. Državna štamparija.
- Teinović, Bratislav (2020). "Преглед српско-турског ратовања на Дрини (1804-1815)". Vojnoistorijski glasnik. 2: 9–35.

Military offices
First	vojvoda of Podgorina knežina ?–7 May 1809	Succeeded by Dimitrije Kedić
Other offices
Preceded by Ilija Birčanin	knez of Podgorina knežina February 1804–7 May 1809	Succeeded by Dimitrije Kedić (?)
