= Radovan Grbović =

Serbian knez and vojvoda (1760–1832)

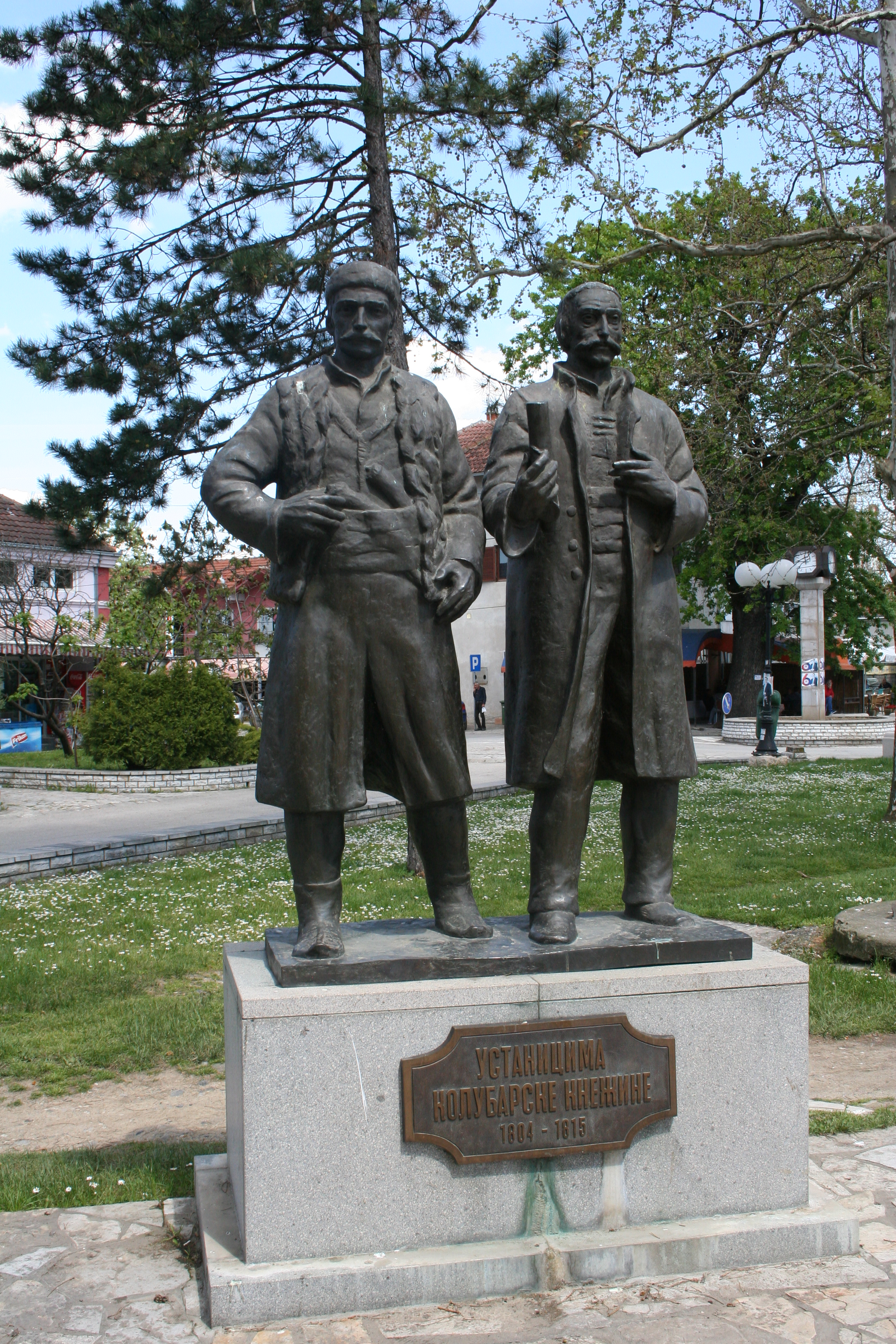
- Monument to the Kolubara rebels, Mionica
- Born: c. 1760; Mratišić, Ottoman Empire (now Serbia)
- Died: 1832
- Relatives: Nikola Grbović (father), Milovan, Stevan and Luka (brothers)
- Military career
- Allegiance: Revolutionary Serbia
- Service years: 1804–1813
- Rank: vojvoda (general)
- Units: Valjevo nahija army; Kolubara unit
- Commands: Valjevska Kolubara
- Conflicts: First Serbian Uprising

Radovan Grbović (1760–1832) was a knez and vojvoda in the First Serbian Uprising. He took over both positions after the death of his brother Milovan Grbović,and in 1811 he was reaffirmed as the vojvoda of the Valjevska Kolubara knezina in the Valjevo nahiya. In the period 1809-1813, he took part in the battles on the Drina, and during the time of relative calm, was one of the commanders of the trench at Razanj. He also fought in the second uprising but was soon pushed into the background by Miloš Obrenović. His brother Luka Grbović also participated in second uprising.

== See also ==
- List of people of the First Serbian Uprising
- Serbian Army (revolutionary)

== Sources ==
- Hrabak, Bogumil (1996). "Ваљевци у почетним годинама првог српског устанка" (PDF). Гласник Историјског архива Ваљево. 30. Istorijski arhiv Valjevo.
- Milićević, Milan Đ. (1888). Поменик знаменитих људи у српског народа новијега доба. Издање Чупићеве задужбине – via Archive.org.
- Nenadović, Konstantin N. (1884). Живот и дела великог Ђорђа Петровића Кара-Ђорђа. Vol. II (1 ed.). Vienna: У Штампарији Јована Н. Вернаја – via Google Books.
- Nenadović, Konstantin N. (1903) [1883]. Живот и дела великог Ђорђа Петровића Кара-Ђорђа. Vol. I (2 ed.). Belgrade: Штампа Савића и Комп. – via Archive.org.
- Stojšić, I. (1926). "Једна заборављена породица". Наша нахија (алманах). Београд: 62–76.
- Teinović, Bratislav (2020). "Преглед српско-турског ратовања на Дрини (1804-1815)" (PDF). Војноисторијски гласник. 2. Институт за стратегијска истраживања: 9–35.

Military offices
Preceded by Milovan Grbović	vojvoda of Kolubara knežina 1808–	Succeeded by Luka Grbović
Other offices
Preceded by Milovan Grbović	knez of Kolubara knežina 1808–	Succeeded by Luka Grbović
