= Milivoje Tadić =

Serbian commander (fl. 1804–1815)

- Born: 1770s Sanjak of Smederevo, Ottoman Empire
- Died: after 1815
- Military career
- Allegiance: Revolutionary Serbia
- Service years: 1804–1815
- Rank: vojvoda (1815)
- Units: Valjevo nahija army; Podgorje
- Commands: Valjevo area, Drina frontier
- Known for: commander in Valjevo nahija and Drina frontier

Milivoje Tadić (Serbian: Миливоје Тадић; fl. 1804–1815) was a Serbian commander in the area of Valjevo and Podrinje in the First Serbian Uprising (1804–13). He was usually part of the Valjevo army of the Nenadović family.

Tadić lived in the Valjevo nahiya. Valjevo nahiya leaders Jakov Nenadović and archpriest Matija Nenadović, the brother and son of Aleksa, respectively, gathered 700 men at the Brankovina hill on 27 February [O.S. 15 February] 1804 and called upon knez Nikola Grbović of Kolubara and knez Milić Kedić of Podgorje to join them and avenge the knezes. They immediately gathered men from their knežina and went for Valjevo, with Kedić and Milivoje Tadić setting camp southwest of the town at the Vrana hill. Kedić and Tadić took the Brđani hill while Grbović went to Žuber to the east of the town. Nenadović's army set up northeast of the town towards the Vrana hill where Kedić now was based. Grbović and Matija Nenadović discussed the operation on 11 March [O.S. 28 February] 1804 at Pošare, and on his way back, Grbović had chardaks, hay and straws outside the town lit on fire. Kedić saw the smoke in the evening and believed that the siege had begun, and entered the town from the south while Tadić descended Brđani into the town. They set Turk houses on fire and entered combat, upon which Grbović and Matija Nenadović attacked from their sides. The Turks fortified themselves in a stone courtyard but decided that they couldn't withstand the attack, and in the morning escaped through the western side, and went for Bosnia. Jakov destroyed a reinforcement at Svileuva and then besieged Šabac. Kedić protected the Valjevo nahija from reinforcements from Soko while Grbović protected it from Užice. The Dahije were supported by captain Ali-paša Vidajić of the Sanjak of Zvornik against the Serbs that attacked the towns of Valjevo and Šabac in springtime 1804.

Tadić fought under the command of the Nenadović family throughout the uprising, mostly being active in the Drina frontier. The Nenadović and Milan Obrenović led the siege of Užice, surrendered by 1 August [O.S. 20 July] 1805. The sultan ordered the Viziers of Bosnia in 1805 to muster armies to attack Serbia, and they crossed the Drina and attacked Valjevo and Šabac in late January 1806. The vojvoda Jakov Nenadović sought to make the nahiyas under his command autonomous of Karađorđe's rule and wrote a draft dated 25 April 1806 that acknowledged the Valjevo nahija's subordination to the Governing Council but explicitly named Nenadović the "supreme rule" (vrhovna vlast); Tadić was one of the signatories, without a rank.

Upon the failure of the uprising in 1813, Tadić stayed in Valjevo and was a signatory of the letter sent from the Topčider assembly to Matija Nenadović asking for Russian aid dated 8 August 1814. In the Second Serbian Uprising, led by Miloš Obrenović, Tadić was elevated to vojvoda. He commanded a trench in the uprising.

== See also ==
- Serbian Army (revolutionary)
- List of Serbian Revolutionaries
- Timeline of the Serbian Revolution

== Sources ==
- Batalaka, Lazar Arsenijević (1898). Историја српског устанка: део први [History of the Serbian Uprising: Part One]. Vol. I. Izd. Batalakinoga fonda. pp. 99–102, 228 – via Google Books.
- Batalaka, Lazar Arsenijević (1899). Историја српског устанка: део други [History of the Serbian Uprising: Part Two]. Vol. II. Штампано у штампарији. p. 656 – via Google Books.
- Milićević, Milan Đ. (1888). Поменик знаменитих људи у српског народа новијега доба [Memory Book]. Издање Чупићеве задужбине – via Archive.org.
- Nenadović, Konstantin N. (1884). Живот и дела великог Ђорђа Петровића Кара-Ђорђа [Life and Deeds of Great Đorđe Petrović Kara-Đorđe]. Vol. II (1 ed.). Vienna: У Штампарији Јована Н. Вернаја – via Google Books.
- Nenadović, Konstantin N. (1903) [1883]. Живот и дела великог Ђорђа Петровића Кара-Ђорђа [Life and Deeds of Great Đorđe Petrović Kara-Đorđe]. Vol. I (2 ed.). Belgrade: Штампа Савића и Комп. – via Archive.org.
- Novaković, Stojan (1904). Устанак на дахије 1804 [Uprising against the Dahije]. Штампано у Државној штампарији – via Archive.org.
- Protić, Kosta (1893). "Ратни догађаји из првога српског устанка под Карађорђем Петровићем 1804—1813". Годишњица Николе Чупића. XIII. Државна штампарија: 124–126.
- Teinović, Bratislav (2020). "Преглед српско-турског ратовања на Дрини (1804-1815)". Vojnoistorijski glasnik. 2: 9–35.
