= Milovan Grbović =

Serbian revolutionary (died 1808)

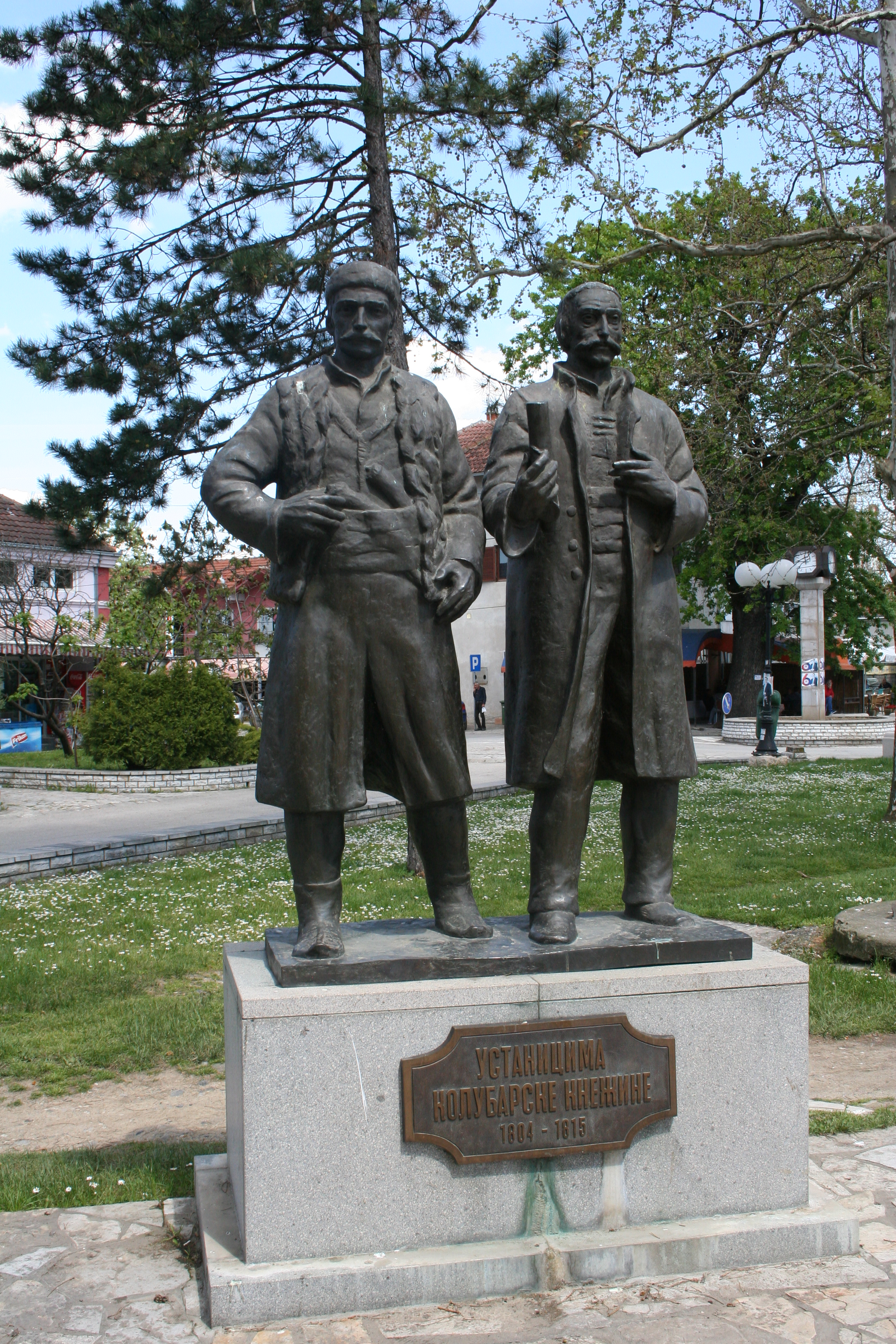
- Monument to the Kolubara rebels, Mionica
- Born: Mratišić, Ottoman Empire (now Serbia)
- Died: 1808; Mratišić
- Cause of death: illness
- Relatives: Nikola Grbović (father), Stevan, Radovan and Luka (brothers)
- Military career
- Allegiance: Revolutionary Serbia
- Service years: 1804–1808
- Rank: vojvoda (general)
- Units: Valjevo nahija army; Kolubara unit
- Commands: Valjevska Kolubara
- Conflicts: First Serbian Uprising

Milovan Grbović (Serbian: Милован Грбовић) was a Serb revolutionary that participated in the First Serbian Uprising, notably as a vojvoda (general) of Valjevska Kolubara. He was the son of knez Nikola Grbović.

== Life ==
Grbović was born in the village of Mratišić, part of the Valjevska Kolubara knežina (Serb self-governing area) of the Valjevo nahiya in the Sanjak of Smederevo ("Belgrade Pashalik"). He was the son of knez of Kolubara, Nikola Grbović, and had an older brother, Stevan, and two younger, Radovan and Luka. Out of the four brothers, Milovan was the most able, accompanying and being sent in the place of his father in all affairs. During the Slaughter of the Knezes in late January 1804, Milovan was captured and imprisoned with knezes Aleksa Nenadović and Ilija Birčanin, his father's close associates. Aleksa and Ilija were executed, while Milovan was released. His father was the intended target.

With the outbreak of uprising against the Dahije, Milovan accompanied his father, who rallied Kolubara and fought under the command of the main rebel leader in the Valjevo nahiya, Jakov Nenadović, Aleksa's brother. Milovan participated in the takeover of Valjevo, siege of Šabac, mustering at Belgrade, takeover of Požarevac and takeover of Smederevo, with rebels of Kolubara and Podgorina, as part of Jakov's army.

The sultan ordered the Viziers of Bosnia in 1805 to muster armies to attack Serbia, and they crossed the Drina and attacked Valjevo and Šabac in late January 1806. In 1806, he and his father fought under the command of supreme leader Karađorđe in Loznica, Žičko polje, and Jelenča. With Jakov, he and Milić Kedić fought the 6,000-strong Ottoman Bosnian contingent led by Osman-Džora at Čučuge, a battle which left 2,800 enemies killed. The rest of the Ottoman force fled towards the Drina, pursued by units under the command of Kedić, Milovan and buljubaša Mihailo Nedić, which killed off most of them. In July 1806 he and Kedić fought at Bukovica and Bratačić against Hadji Bey, who lost many men and was pursued across the Drina. After this, he fought in Šabac and several places on the Drina, including Baurić, and in 1808 in Rožanj near Soko, where Kedić was saved from encirclement by the Valjevo army. At Rožanj, he became sick and returned home, where he died. He was succeeded as vojvoda of Kolubara by his brother Radovan.

== See also ==
- List of people of the First Serbian Uprising
- Serbian Army (revolutionary)

== Sources ==
- Hrabak, Bogumil (1996). "Ваљевци у почетним годинама првог српског устанка" (PDF). Гласник Историјског архива Ваљево. 30. Istorijski arhiv Valjevo.
- Milićević, Milan Đ. (1888). Поменик знаменитих људи у српског народа новијега доба. Издање Чупићеве задужбине – via Archive.org.
- Nenadović, Konstantin N. (1884). Живот и дела великог Ђорђа Петровића Кара-Ђорђа. Vol. II (1 ed.). Vienna: У Штампарији Јована Н. Вернаја – via Google Books.
- Nenadović, Konstantin N. (1903) [1883]. Живот и дела великог Ђорђа Петровића Кара-Ђорђа. Vol. I (2 ed.). Belgrade: Штампа Савића и Комп. – via Archive.org.
- Stojšić, I. (1926). "Једна заборављена породица". Наша нахија (алманах). Београд: 62–76.
- Teinović, Bratislav (2020). "Преглед српско-турског ратовања на Дрини (1804-1815)" (PDF). Војноисторијски гласник. 2. Институт за стратегијска истраживања: 9–35.

Military offices
Preceded by Stevan Grbović	vojvoda of Kolubara knežina ?–1808	Succeeded by Radovan Grbović
Other offices
Preceded by Stevan Grbović	knez of Kolubara knežina ?–1808	Succeeded by Radovan Grbović
