= Curcija =

Curcija or Ćurčija (Serbian: Ћурчија) is a surname from the Slavic-speaking region of the Balkans. The name translates to "furrier".

- Đorđe Ćurčija (died 1804), Serbian military commander
- Michael Curcija (born 1977), Australian football striker
