= Rađevina =

Geographic subregion of Podrinje, Serbia

Coordinates: 44.3136°N 19.5536°E

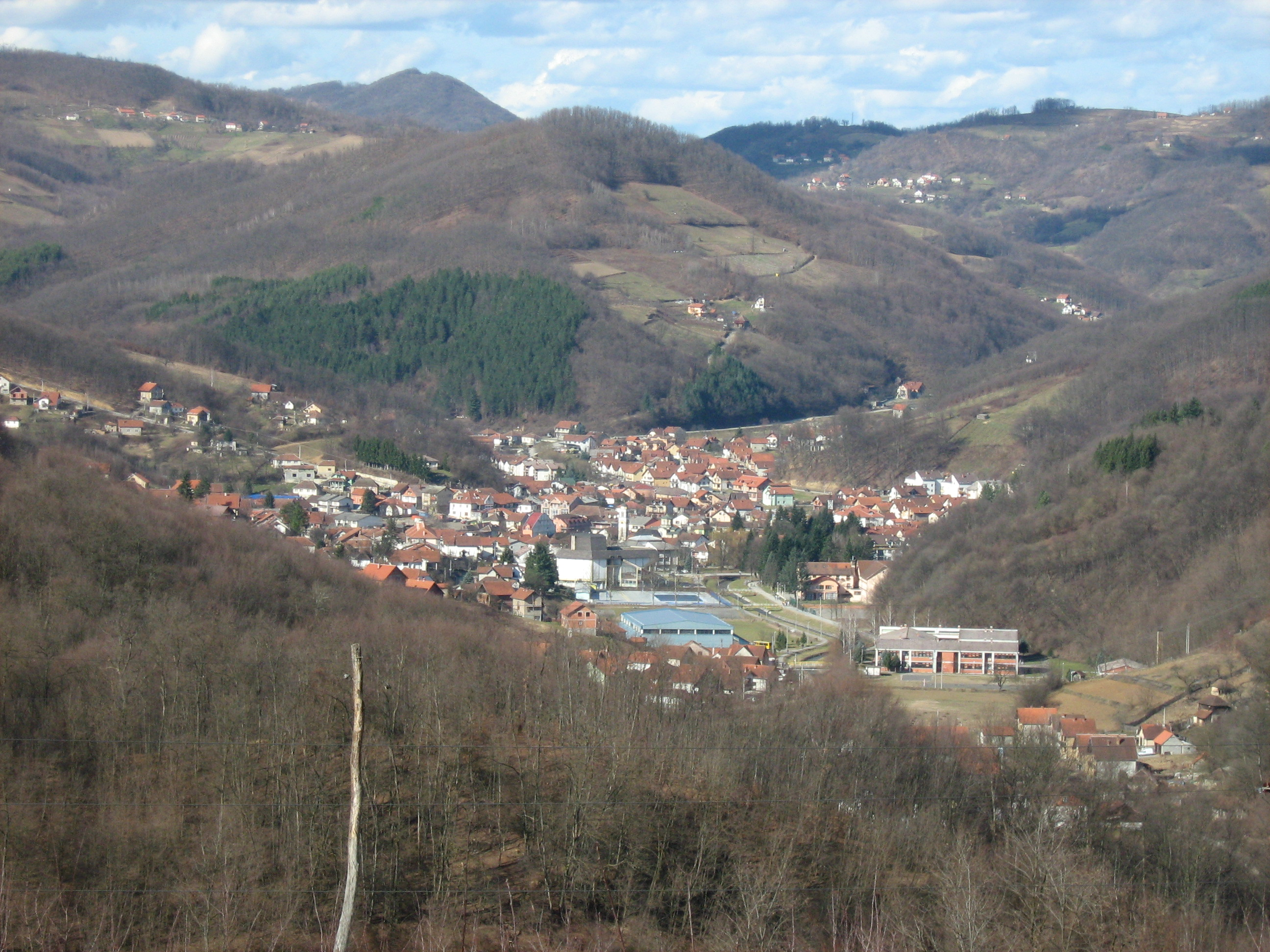
Panorama of Krupanj

Rađevina (Serbian Cyrillic: Рађевина) is a subregion of Podrinje, in western Serbia. It is situated between mountains of Vlašić, Cer, Jagodnja and Sokolska planina. Rađevina is predominantly hilly and mountainous area full of forests and pastures with clear and rapid streams. The highest peak is Košutnja stopa on the mountain Jagodnja (940 m).

Its largest part belongs to the municipality of Krupanj, consisting of 22 villages: Banjevac, Bela Crkva, Bogoštica, Brezovice, Brštica, Vrbić, Palatine, Zavlaka, Kostajnik, Krasava, Kržava, Likodra, Lipenović, Mojković, Planina, Ravnaja, Stave, Tolisavac, Tomanj, Cvetulja, Cerova, Šljivova and the town of Krupanj, which is the economic, cultural and political center of the municipality.

== History ==
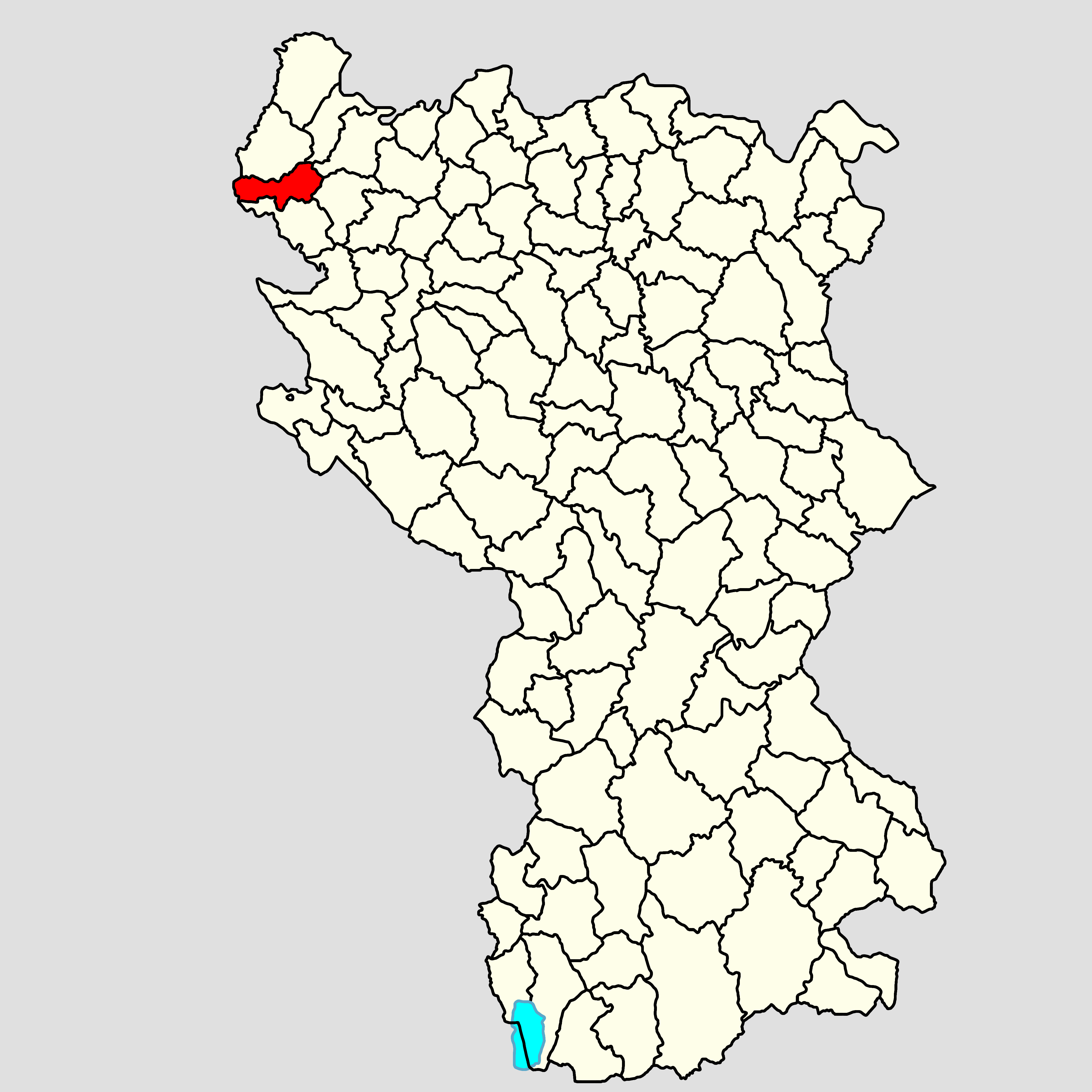
Srez of Rađevina in the Kingdom of Serbia

The region received its name after a legendary vojvoda (general) named Rađ, one of seven knights of Prince Lazar of Serbia. A memorial obelisk in his honour was erected at Rađevo polje ("Rađ's field"), called Rađev kamen ("Rađ's stone").

In the Ottoman period, Rađevina was a nahiya. In the late Ottoman period, Rađevina was a knežina (Serb self-governing group of villages) in the Sanjak of Zvornik, located at the right (Serbian) side of the Drina, between Loznica and Soko.

In the First Serbian Uprising (1804–1813), Rađevina and neighbouring Jadar first rose up in July 1804 under hajduk harambaša Đorđe Ćurčija and was caught up in rebel operations, with Krupanj being liberated. Ćurčija appointed the knez of Rađevina, Krsta Ignjatović, as the starešina (governor) of Rađevina. Ignjatović built a trench above Krupanj. In 1807, Krsta Ignjatović was elevated to vojvoda (general) of Rađevina by supreme leader Karađorđe. The area was a site of skirmishes in Podrinje in 1808.

The Jadar-Rađevina nahiya was ceded to the Principality of Serbia with the 1833 hatt-i sharif (edict) of Sultan Mahmud II. After 1833, Rađevina was a srez in the Podrinje okrug of Serbia with 34 villages and the small town (varošica) Krupanj as seat.

In 1947, the villages of Bastav, Belotić, Komirić and Konjuša were transferred to the Podgorina srez, and eventually became part of the Osečina municipality.

== See also ==
- List of regions of Serbia

== Sources ==
- Đurđev, Aleksandar (2001) [1997], "Историјски развој Крупња", Цркве Крупња [Churches of Krupanj], Janus; Rastko
- Đurđev, Aleksandar (1988). Рађевина: Обичаји, веровања и народно стваралаштво. Дом културе „Политика“, Крупањ – via Rastko.rs.
- Ristanović, Slobodan (1971). Ustanička Rađevina: prilozi za hroniku. Istorijski arhiv.
- Момчило Спремић, Крупањ и Рађевина у средњем веку, Рађевина у прошлости I, Београд 1986
