= Đorđe Ćurčija =

19th century Serbian rebel commander

Đorđe Obradović (Serbian Cyrillic: Ђорђе Обрадовић; d. 1804), better known as Đorđe Ćurčija (Ђорђе Ћурчија) or Ćurta (Ћурта), was a Serbian hajduk commander (harambaša) active in the Sanjak of Smederevo, participating in the beginning of the First Serbian Uprising (1804). When he heard of the outbreak of rebellion against the Dahije in Valjevo and Šumadija Obradović "began to attack the Turks more frequently". He would be purged by his own side before the year was out.

== Biography ==
As a child, he moved from Bosut in Habsburg Syrmia to the Pashalik of Belgrade. For a while he worked as a furrier (ćurčija) in Krupanj, hence his sobriquet. Later, he joined a group of hajduks (highwaymen) and was well-liked by his fellow Serbs but feared by the Turks in Podrinje as an harambaša, a senior commander of a hajduk band. When the uprising broke out in 1804, Obradović joined the insurgents, but already in the first days he showed a certain arbitrariness. He did not take part in the Battle of Čokešina (28 April 1804) due to a quarrel with Jakov Nenadović, one of the most prominent leaders of the uprising in western Serbia, but soon after he fought together with others against the Turks near Belgrade and during the capture of Požarevac. There he again came into conflict with Jakov Nenadović, and also with Karađorđe, so he went to Mačva with his men. He dominated Jadar, Rađevina and the scaffold towards Sremska Mitrovica and from there he led the fight against the Turks on his own.

Undisciplined by nature, his quarrel with Nikola Grbović and Luka Lazarević, as well as an incursion by the Turks from the Drina, hastened the decision to remove him. Ćurčija was suddenly attacked in Novo Selo in the summer of 1804, where he was killed resisting Jakov Nenadović's men.

Đorđe Ćurčija's scribe during the 1804 uprising was Vuk Stefanović Karadžić.

== See also ==
- List of Serbian Revolutionaries

== Sources ==
- Ilić, Mikica (15 February 2017). "Đorđe Obradović – Ćurčija, Karađorđev ustanik iz Bosuta". M novine (791). Sremska Mitrovica: 35–41 – via Academia.edu.
- Milićević, Milić J. (2016). "Битка код Чокешине". Гласник. 50. Историјски архив Ваљево: 11–24. ISSN 0354-9143.
- Šašić, Branko (1998). Znameniti Šapčani i Podrinci. Udruženje Građana Sport u Podrinju.
- excerpt at "Đorđe Obradović Ćurčija (17xx—1804)".
- Tomić, Persida, ed. (1964). "Јадар". Гласник Етнографског музеја у Београду. 27. Etnografski muzej u Beogradu.
