= Battle of Valjevo (1804) =

Battle part of the first Serbian uprising

- Part of the First Serbian Uprising
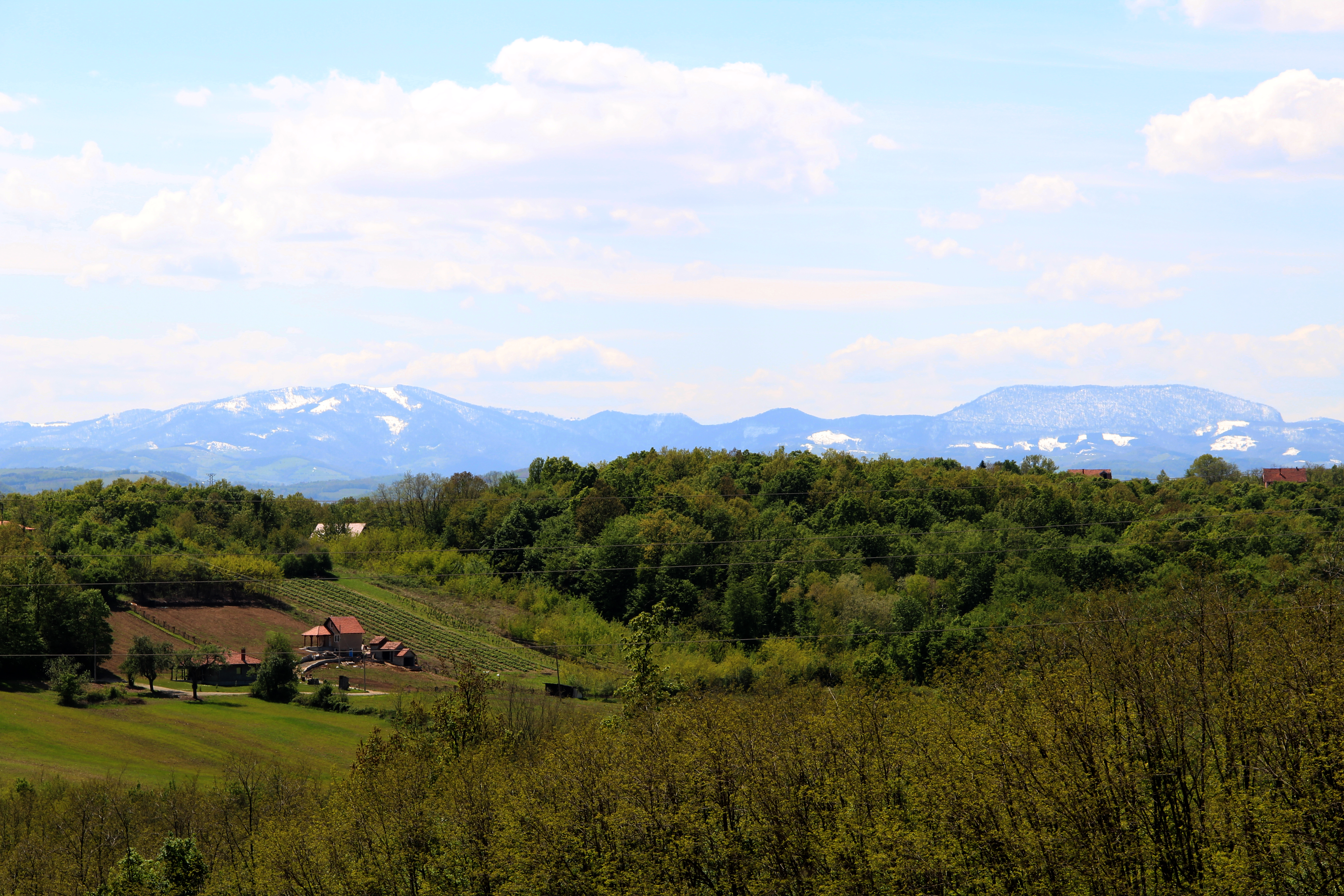
- Gornja Grabovica with the Valjevo Mountains in the background
Date	10–12 March 1804
Location	Valjevo, Sanjak of Smederevo, Ottoman Empire (today Serbia)
Result	Serbian victory
Territorial changes	Valjevo in rebel hands

Belligerents
Serbian rebels	Dahije (Ottoman Empire) Ottoman city garrison

Commanders and leaders
Matija Nenadović; Nikola Grbović; Milić Kedić	Poreč-Alija

Units involved
Valjevo nahija	Janissaries; Valjevo deli and local soldiers Ub soldiers

Strength
c. 350	700+

Casualties and losses
Many	Many

The Battle of Valjevo was undertaken by the Serbian rebel army led by archpriest Matija Nenadović and knez Nikola Grbović against the city of Valjevo, in the hands of the Dahije (renegade Janissaries) in March 1804. Valjevo was the centre of the Valjevo nahiya in the west of the main rebel territory of Šumadija. It was in the hands of Poreč-Alija, a notorious Janissary. After failed negotiations, the rebels besieged and assaulted the city, forcing the "Turks" to leave it.

== Background ==
After the Slaughter of the Knezes (January 1804), in which Serb notables of the Belgrade Pashalik were murdered, including Mehmed-aga Fočić's executions of obor-knez Aleksa Nenadović and obor-knez Ilija Birčanin, the Valjevo "Turks", including yerli (natives) and Janissaries, decided that all Turk men of Ub be transferred to Valjevo and their women and children to Užice and Soko. Valjevo was to be ready to defend itself from a potential Serb retaliation.

On 14 February [O.S. 2 February] 1804, Serb notables met at Orašac in the Kragujevac nahiya and decided to rise up under the command of Karađorđe. Aleksa's brother Jakov Nenadović had succeeded as obor-knez of Tamnava, and when hearing that the Kragujevac, Rudnik and most of the Belgrade nahiyas had risen up, he and his nephew, Aleksa's son, the archpriest Matija Nenadović, decided to organize rebellion in the Valjevo nahiya. Jakov and Matija took their villagers to the Posovo mountain and Jakov went through the Tamnava and Posavska knežina and traded in swines and cattle to fund rebellion. Matija set out to discuss the matter with the villages and was met with great enthusiasm regarding Karađorđe's uprising in the first village he crossed, that of Kutemica, meeting with Savko Savković and other notables. Matija and Savko called upon Milić Kedić, the buljubaša (captain) of executed Birčanin, and the knez of Kolubara, Nikola Grbović, the close associate of Aleksa and Birčanin. Grbović had survived the slaughter as he was ill and thus escaped capture. On 27 February [O.S. 15 February] 1804, or the following day, the Serb notables of the Valjevo nahiya gathered at the Brankovina height (Brankovački vis) and decided to rise up against the Dahije. Some 700 men were gathered, but they were ill-equipped. Jakov sent Matija to acquire weaponry and ammunition via Austrian officer Mitesser in Semlin (Zemun), a friend of the Nenadović family. Arsenije Raonić and Živko Dabić (the son-in-law of Aleksa) immediately went to Ljubinić where they burnt down the inns (hanovi). The majority of the mustered Tamnava rebels were subsequently deterred from rising up through serfs (kmet) that were in contact with Poreč-Alija, the Dahije commander of Valjevo, but they were persuaded by Matija to gather at Ljubinić with the rest of the Valjevo nahiya rebel army. The Šabac Turks called the Sanjak of Zvornik to aid against the rebels.

Jakov took 300 men of Posavina and Tamnava and went to Beljin and fought with the Šabac Turk detachment on 6 March [O.S. 23 February] 1804, with many wounded on both sides, the rebels losing buljubaša Isailo Lazić, and the Turks losing Arpadžić-beg. The Šabac Turk detachment went to support Valjevo via Svileuva, in the hands of priest Luka Lazarević and Ostoja Spužić and their 300–400 men, and they clashed, with daily shootings from the Gomilica mountain. The Valjevo rebels were informed on Karađorđe's clash at Drlupa. The town of Rudnik was taken by the rebel army led by Karađorđe and Milan Obrenović on 6 March.

== History ==
Matija acquired more ammunition from Živković at Zabrežje, while buljubaša Živan Petrović, Arsenije Raonić and Vasil went to Pošar and Jasenica to gather more men and to watch Poreč-Alija, and to hold contact with Nikola Grbović, Milić Kedić and Milivoje Tadić. Matija went to Gomilica where the Valjevo nahiya rebel army and hajduk (brigand) harambaša leaders (Nedić brothers, Đorđe from Ostružje) camped, left half of the ammunition, and then went to Grabovica where he took the command of 200 chosen men to aid his uncle Jakov, but on the way decided to go for Valjevo, on 8 March [O.S. 25 February] 1804. Matija wanted to live in peace with the Valjevo Turks and thus decided to negotiate.

Matija's detachment approached Valjevo, where they met with six of the town's yerli and demanded that they give up Poreč-Alija, the Dahije commander in the town, and all of his followers. One of the Valjevo Turk negotiators was a sipahi (Ottoman noble cavalry) and associate of Matija's late father. The rebels ensured that the yerli would be left in peace in the city. Matija told them that the rebels had the support of Dervish Bey, the son of murdered Vizier Hadji Mustafa Pasha, and that his binbaşı (commander) Deli-Ahmet was in their midst. The Valjevo Turks were asked not to support the Dahije, and the rebels said that the Serbs wanted peace as prior to the Dahije and Slaughter of the Knezes. If they didn't comply, the rebels would attack the city, but Matija still told them to take the Turks loyal to the sultan to safety in the çarşı (marketplace) in the upper part while the rebels would attack Poreč-Alija's konak (mansion). Poreč-Alija was wanted dead or alive, and if the Valjevo Turks defended him, they would be held accountable.

During the negotiations, Nikola Grbović appeared with a unit and Jovica Milutinović made ready a barjak (war flag) of scarves. The sipahi asked Matija how he was able to muster such a number of rebels and he answered "you have the haraç defter (Christian tax register), so you should now how many heads there are", and described how all men, young and old, had risen up, and what they now had before them was only what was mustered from Slovac to Brankovina, while other armies were under Milovan and Kedić at Brankovina, at Beli Brod, at Palež watching Belgrade, at Gomilica and Svileuva watching the Šabac and Zvornik troops, the latter encircled by Jakov. The Valjevo Turks were now given five days of contemplation, either give up Poreč-Alija or be attacked.

In the following days, Grbović appeared with his unit outside the city and then returned to the camp. Jovica flew war flags in the surroundings as to induce fear. Matija and buljubaša Živan led the discussions on attack plans, with Grbović commenting that while the siege camp awaited events in Svileuva where 200 men were stationed, it was better to begin the operation; Grbović wanted to set fire to hay and chardaks to scare Valjevo. Matija approved, and on the night of 10 or 11 March [O.S. 28 February] 1804, Grbović's men immediately set it in motion and set fire to hay and chardaks towards Žuber near Valjevo, half an hour from Valjevo, and this could be seen clearly in the region. He wanted to show the Valjevo Turks that the rebels were serious, "let the dog's faith know that we do not joke, and really want to incinerate". Kedić at the Vrana height and Tadić at Brđani, on the other side of Valjevo, saw the smoke and believed that an assault had begun, thus proceeded to enter the city and put houses on fire. Kedić entered the Serb mahala (neighbourhood) while Tadić entered the Vidrak mahala, inhabited by Turks, and set houses on fire and shootouts began. Matija, camping at Grabovica with 500 men, was informed in the night by a sentry that Valjevo was in flames and saw it for himself, then hurried for Valjevo. Poreč-Alija ordered for the nearby houses, both Turk and Serb, to be put on fire as to gain distance with muskets on incoming rebels for better defense. This made it look like the city was on fire from a far. All yerli and Janissaries gathered at Poreč-Alija's fortification and were set up by the walls. Matija's unit with only 100 muskets descended into the Kličevac field where a skirmish left two rebels from Vrhovina dead. The next day, 12 March [O.S. 29 February] 1804, the rebels attacked the city and the fight took a whole day, with many casualties on both sides. Matija's unit put some houses on fire and forced Turks into Poreč-Alija's courtyard. The rebels retreated cross the Kolubara to continue the attack the next day, and discussed further plans. Grbović stressed that Valjevo couldn't be defended without a cannon, and that they should hold it in siege until hunger and other anguish strikes, and that the rebels had insufficient ammunition which Matija should acquire more of while Grbović "blackmail them, as they did to my Aleksa and Birčanin". That night, Matija and his men saw the red sky over Rudnik, burnt down by Karađorđe's troops, while they too, saw the flames of Valjevo. At the same time, Jakov Nenadović destroyed a unit at Svileuva, leaving 270 dead and many wounded. In the night, the Turks decided to give up the city and fled to Užice or Soko. Matija, while at Zabrežje, was informed on 14 March [O.S. 2 March] 1804 on Jakov's victory at Svileuva, and Grbović informed that the Valjevo Turks had left the city for Soko in the night prior to 13 March [O.S. 1 March] 1804.

== Aftermath and legacy ==
Matija met with Mitesser who congratulated the rebels on their three important victories at Valjevo, Svileuva and Rudnik. Matija proceeded to send letters to Karađorđe and Habsburg Serb metropolitan Stefan Stratimirović. Jakov Nenadović, together with priest Luka Lazarević and Ostoja Spužić, watched Šabac and blocked the roads from Valjevo, setting up ambuscades on the roads from Soko, Užice and Bosnia, then proceeded to approach Ub and Palež. Within ten days, Jakov conquered Ub and Palež and then set out for Šabac. Jakov informed Karađorđe that the Belgrade–Palež roads were blocked off and ready for ambush.

== See also ==
- Timeline of the Serbian Revolution

== Annotations ==
1. It is known in historiography as the "conflicts in Valjevo and liberation of Valjevo" (Serbian: sukobi na Valjevu i oslobođenje Valjeva). According to K. Protić, Grbović's attack began on 11 March [O.S. 28 February] 1804, and the general rebel attack commenced on 12 March [O.S. 29 February] 1804. According to Matija Nenadović, the second day of the attack, in the night of 11 March [O.S. 28 February] 1804, they saw the red sky over Rudnik, burnt by Karađorđe. K. Protić dates the burning of Rudnik to 11 March [O.S. 28 February] 1804. Matija Nenadović was informed that the Turks had left the city in the night of 12 March. Another theory is that the battle took place later, on 19 March [O.S. 7 March] 1804, based on an Austrian intelligence report at Semlin (Zemun) dated 26 March [O.S. 14 March] 1804, and that Nenadović's dating of feast days was lapsus memoriae.

== Sources ==
- Batalaka, Lazar Arsenijević (1898). Историја српског устанка: део први [History of the Serbian Uprising: Part One]. Vol. I. Izd. Batalakinoga fonda – via Google Books.
- Krivošejev, Vladimir (2024), 20. МАРТ 1804. ГОДИНЕ – ДАН КАДА ЈЕ ОСЛОБОЂЕНО ВАЉЕВО, Народни музеј Ваљево [National Museum of Valjevo]
- Milićević, Milan Đ. (1888). Поменик знаменитих људи у српског народа новијега доба [Memory Book]. Издање Чупићеве задужбине – via Archive.org.
- Nenadović, Konstantin N. (1884). Живот и дела великог Ђорђа Петровића Кара-Ђорђа [Life and Deeds of Great Đorđe Petrović Kara-Đorđe]. Vol. II (1 ed.). Vienna: У Штампарији Јована Н. Вернаја – via Google Books.
- Nenadović, Konstantin N. (1903) [1883]. Живот и дела великог Ђорђа Петровића Кара-Ђорђа [Life and Deeds of Great Đorđe Petrović Kara-Đorđe]. Vol. I (2 ed.). Belgrade: Штампа Савића и Комп. – via Archive.org.
- Novaković, Stojan (1904). Устанак на дахије 1804 [Uprising against the Dahije]. Штампано у Државној штампарији – via Archive.org.
- Protić, Kosta (1893). "Ратни догађаји из првога српског устанка под Карађорђем Петровићем 1804—1813". Годишњица Николе Чупића. XIII. Državna štamparija: 124–126.
