= Novo Selo (Loznica) =

Novo Selo Ново Село (Serbian)
- Village (Selo)
- Location within Serbia
- Coordinates: 44°40′N 19°20′E
- Country: Serbia
- District: Mačva District
- Municipality: Loznica

Population (2002)
  - Total: 1,404
- Time zone: UTC+1 (CET)
  - Summer (DST): UTC+2 (CEST)

Novo Selo is a Village in the municipality of Loznica, Serbia. According to the 2002 census, the town has a population of 1404 people. The etymology of the village comes from Slavic languages meaning new village, Novo Selo.
