= Runjani =

Runjani Руњани (Serbian)
- Village (Selo)
- Interactive map of Runjani
- Location in Serbia
- Coordinates: 44°32′N 19°16′E
- Country: Serbia
- District: Mačva District
- Municipality: Loznica
- Time zone: UTC+1 (CET)
  - Summer (DST): UTC+2 (CEST)

Runjani is a village situated in Loznica municipality in Serbia.
