= Nikola Grbović =

Serbian revolutionary (died 1806)

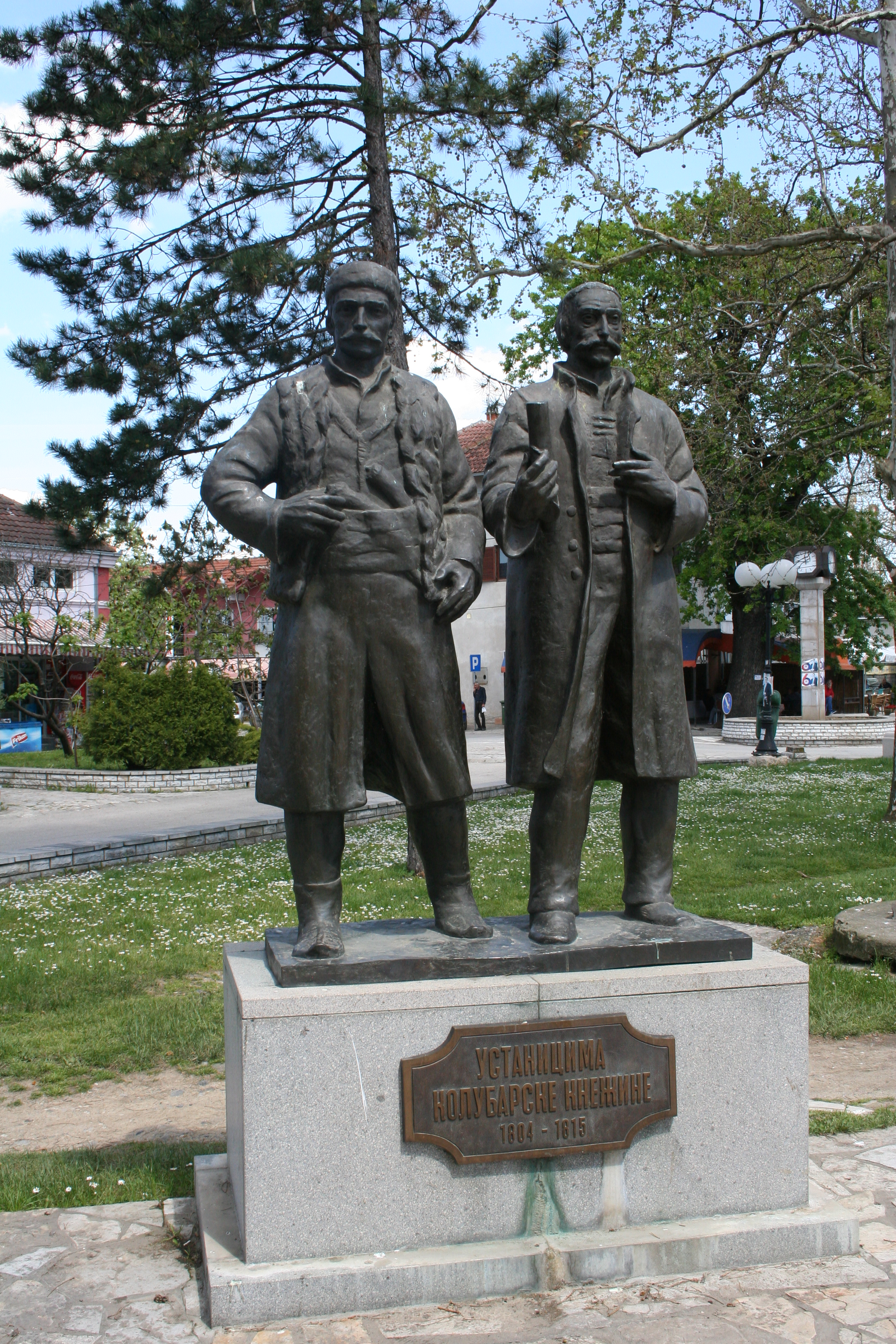
- Monument to the Kolubara rebels, Mionica
- Born: Mratišić, Ottoman Empire (now Serbia)
- Died: December 1806; Mratišić
- Children: Milovan, Stevan, Radovan and Luka
- Military career
- Allegiance: Revolutionary Serbia
- Service years: 1804–1806
- Rank: vojvoda (general)
- Units: Valjevo nahija army; Kolubara unit
- Commands: Valjevska Kolubara
- Conflicts: First Serbian Uprising

Nikola Grbović (Serbian Cyrillic: Никола Грбовић; fl. 1790 – d. December 1806) was a Serbian obor-knez of the Kolubara knežina of the Valjevo nahija in the Sanjak of Smederevo, who later became a Serbian Revolutionary. He was born in Mratišić. He was active in the formation of the district and the Ottoman Serb civil army from 1793–94 to 1796, and took part in the operations against Janissary leader Osman Pazvantoğlu. At the end of November 1797 obor-knezes Aleksa Nenadović, Ilija Birčanin and Nikola Grbović from Valjevo brought their forces to Belgrade and forced the besieging janissary forces to retreat to Smederevo. He participated since the outbreak of the First Serbian Uprising, organizing a detachment of his knežina together with his son Milovan. He was a rebel delegate in the talks with Bekir Pasha in 1804. He participated in the liberation of Valjevo and in the first fights around Belgrade.

Nikola Grbović's sons Stevan, Milovan, Radovan fought in the first uprising, and Luka fought in the Second Serbian Uprising.

== See also ==
- List of people of the First Serbian Uprising
- Serbian Army (revolutionary)
- Timeline of the Serbian Revolution

== Sources ==
- Hrabak, Bogumil (1996). "Ваљевци у почетним годинама првог српског устанка" (PDF). Гласник Историјског архива Ваљево. 30. Istorijski arhiv Valjevo.
- Milićević, Milan Đ. (1888). Поменик знаменитих људи у српског народа новијега доба. Издање Чупићеве задужбине – via Archive.org.
- Nenadović, Konstantin N. (1884). Живот и дела великог Ђорђа Петровића Кара-Ђорђа. Vol. II (1 ed.). Vienna: У Штампарији Јована Н. Вернаја – via Google Books.
- Nenadović, Konstantin N. (1903) [1883]. Живот и дела великог Ђорђа Петровића Кара-Ђорђа. Vol. I (2 ed.). Belgrade: Штампа Савића и Комп. – via Archive.org.
- Stojšić, I. (1926). "Једна заборављена породица". Наша нахија (алманах). Београд: 62–76.
- Teinović, Bratislav (2020). "Преглед српско-турског ратовања на Дрини (1804-1815)" (PDF). Војноисторијски гласник. 2. Институт за стратегијска истраживања: 9–35.
