= Mratišić =

Coordinates: 44.1897°N 19.9528°E

- Village (Selo)
- Interactive map of Mratišić
- Country: Serbia
- District: Kolubara District
- Municipality: Mionica
- Time zone: UTC+1 (CET)
  - Summer (DST): UTC+2 (CEST)

Mratišić is a village situated in Mionica municipality in Serbia.

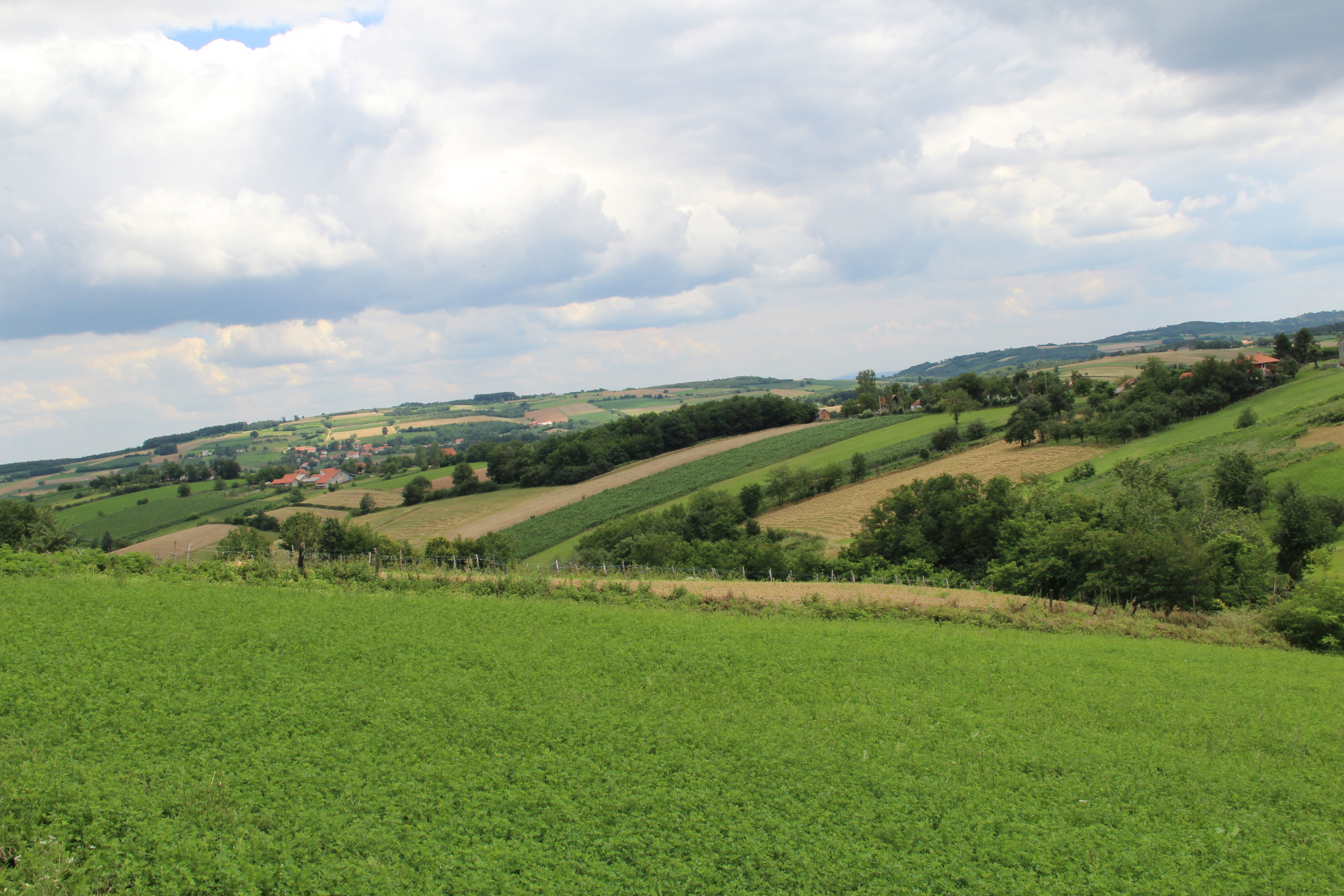
Mratišić - panorama

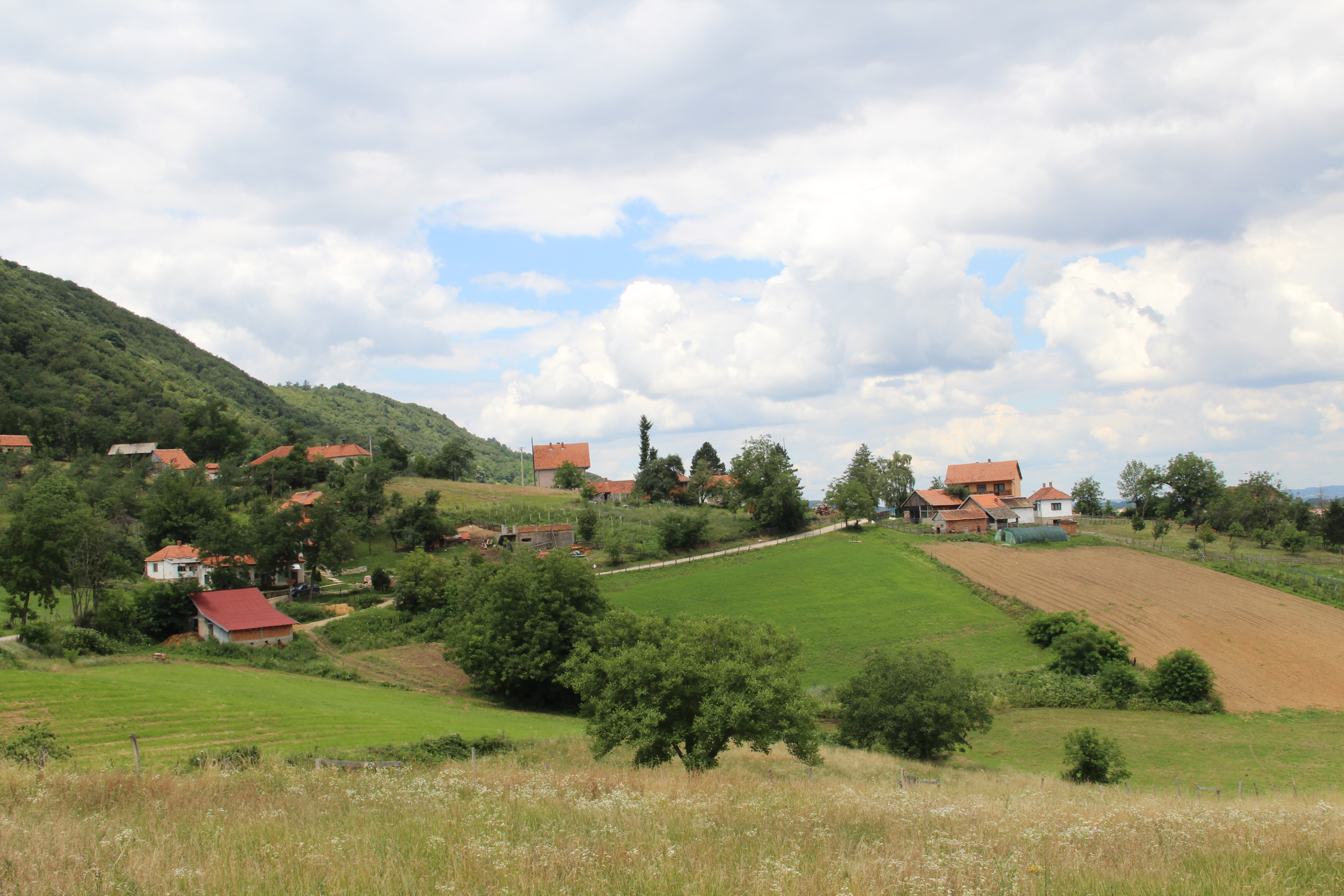
Mratišić - panorama

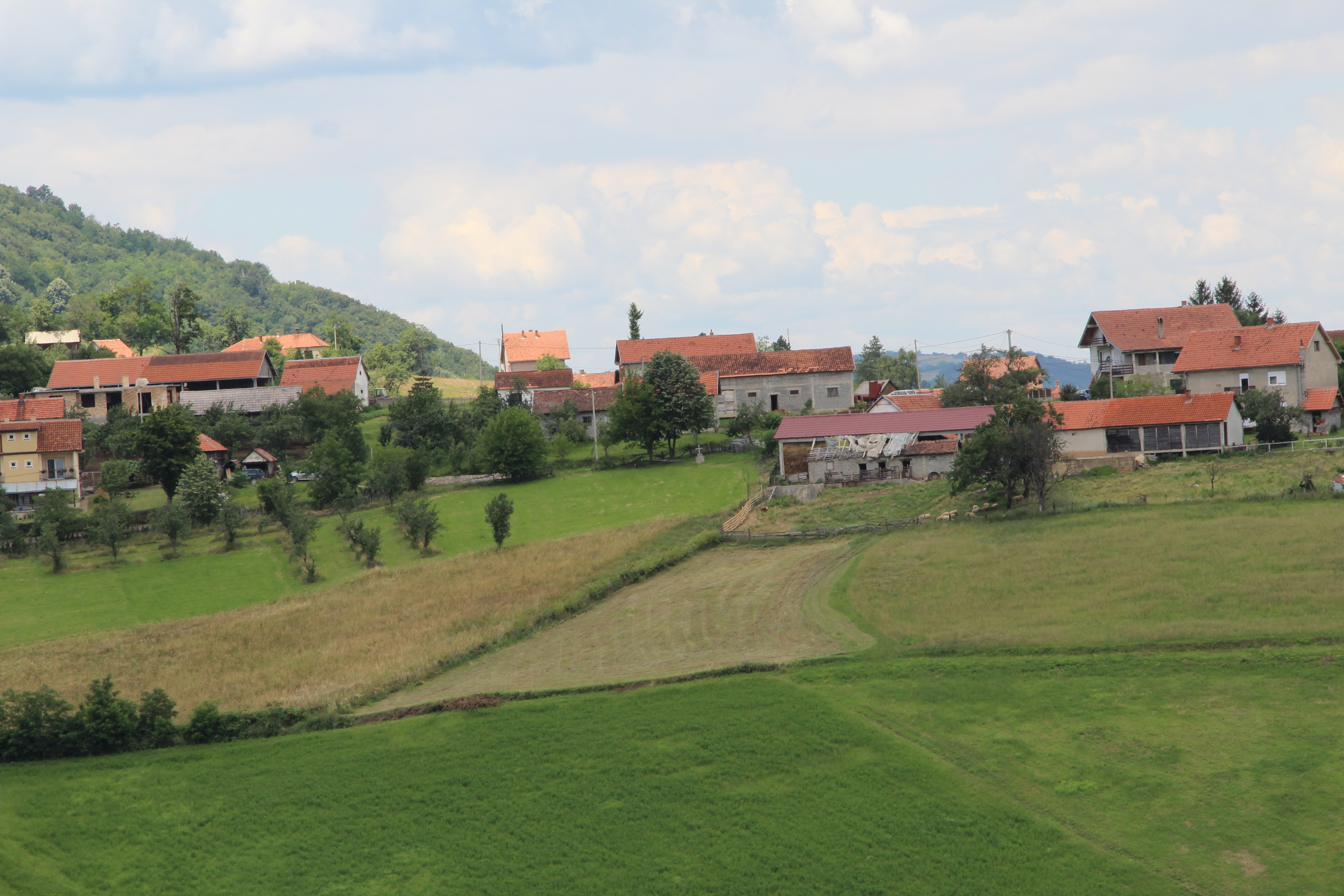
Mratišić - panorama

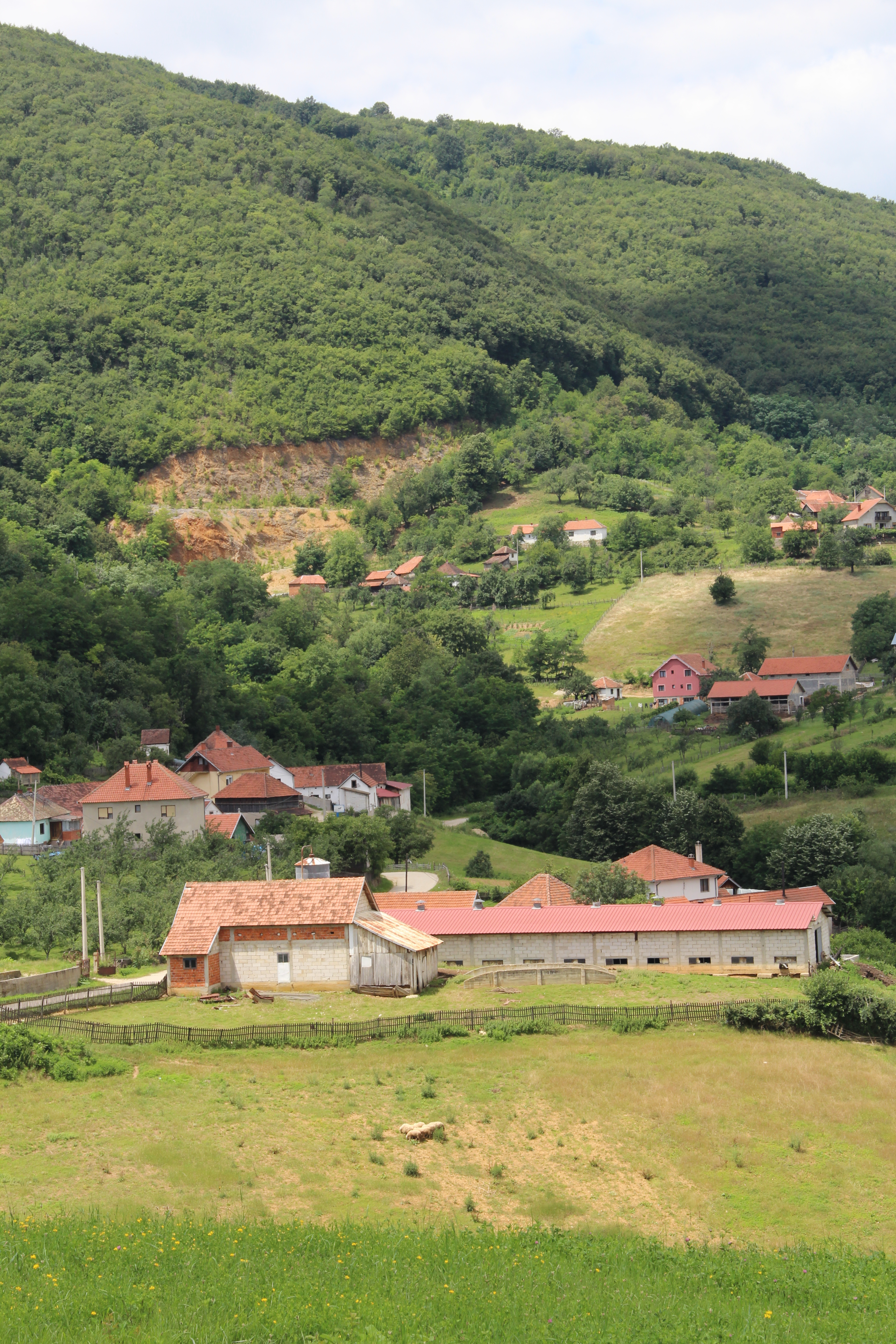
Mratišić - panorama

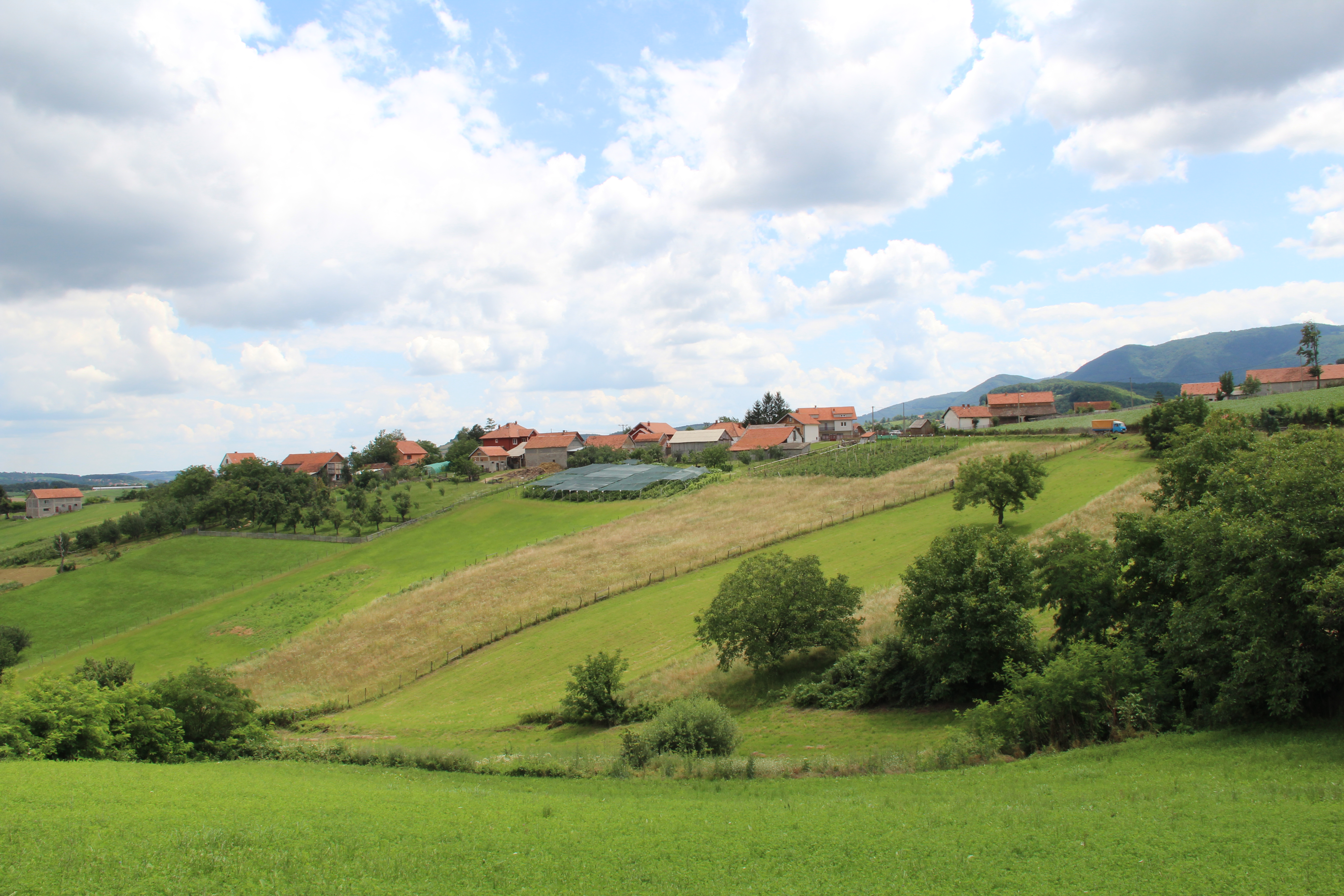
Mratišić - panorama

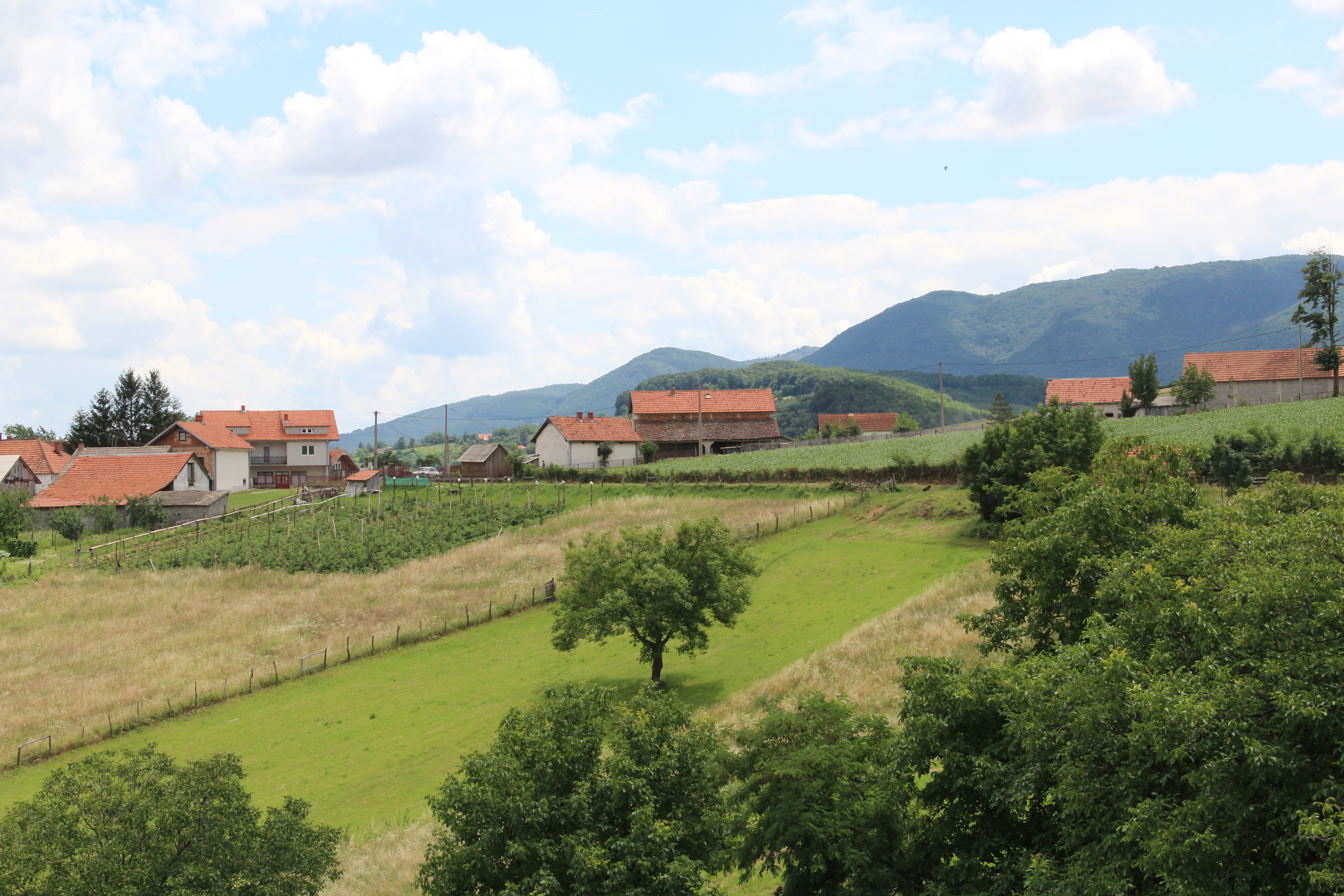
Mratišić - panorama

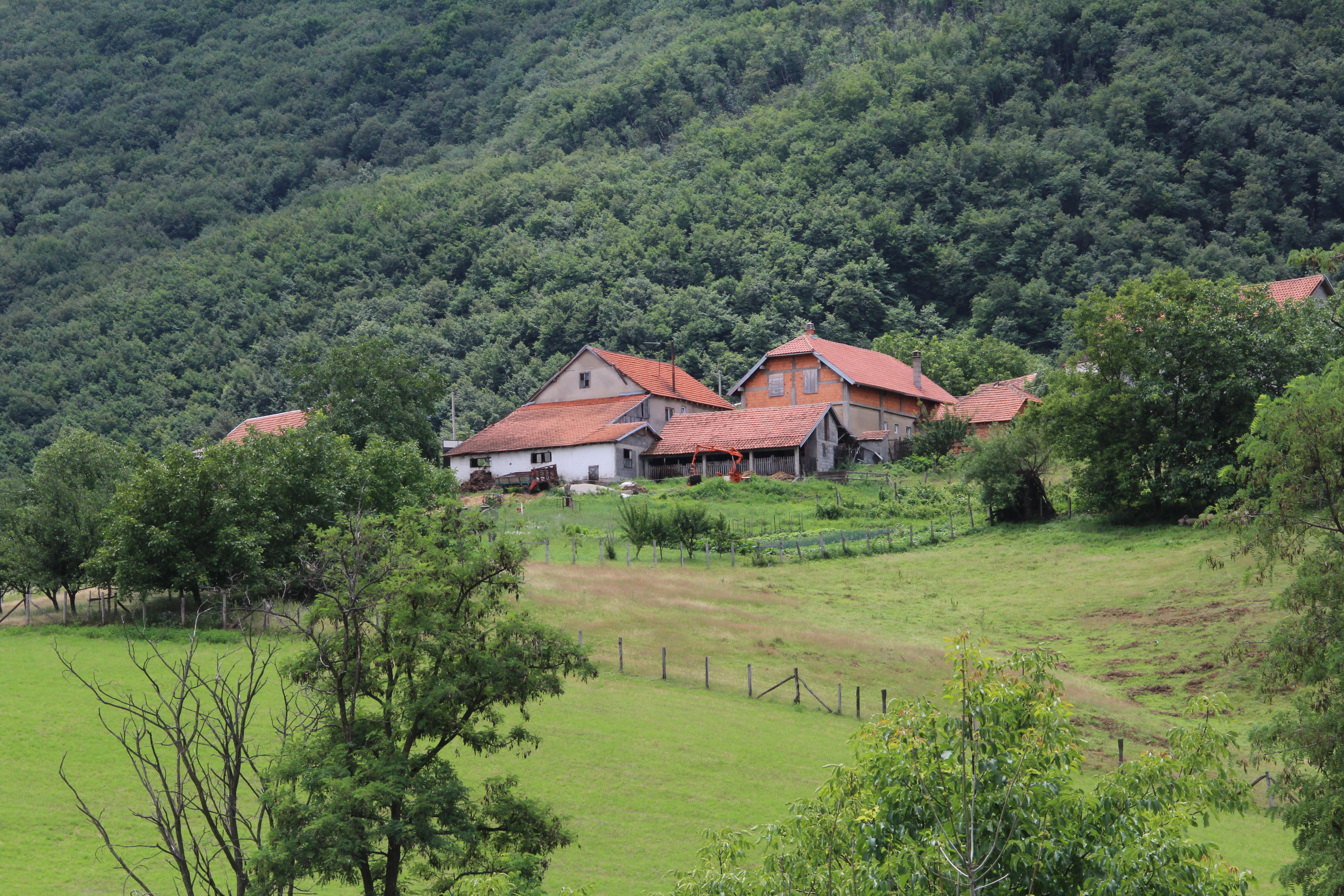
Mratišić - panorama

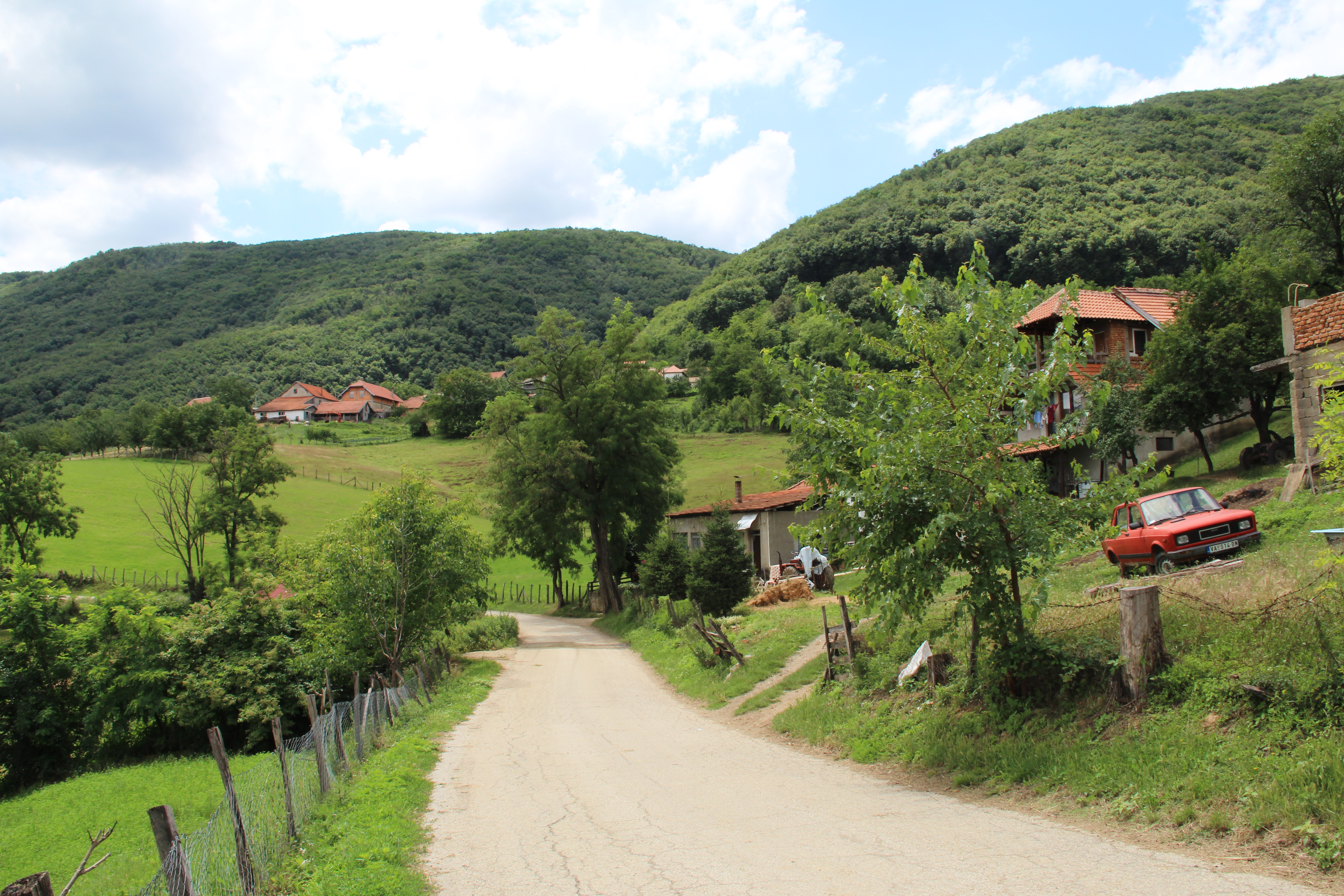
Mratišić - panorama
