= Chardak =

Balkan fortification and dwelling

Coordinates: 44.8556°N 21.0947°E

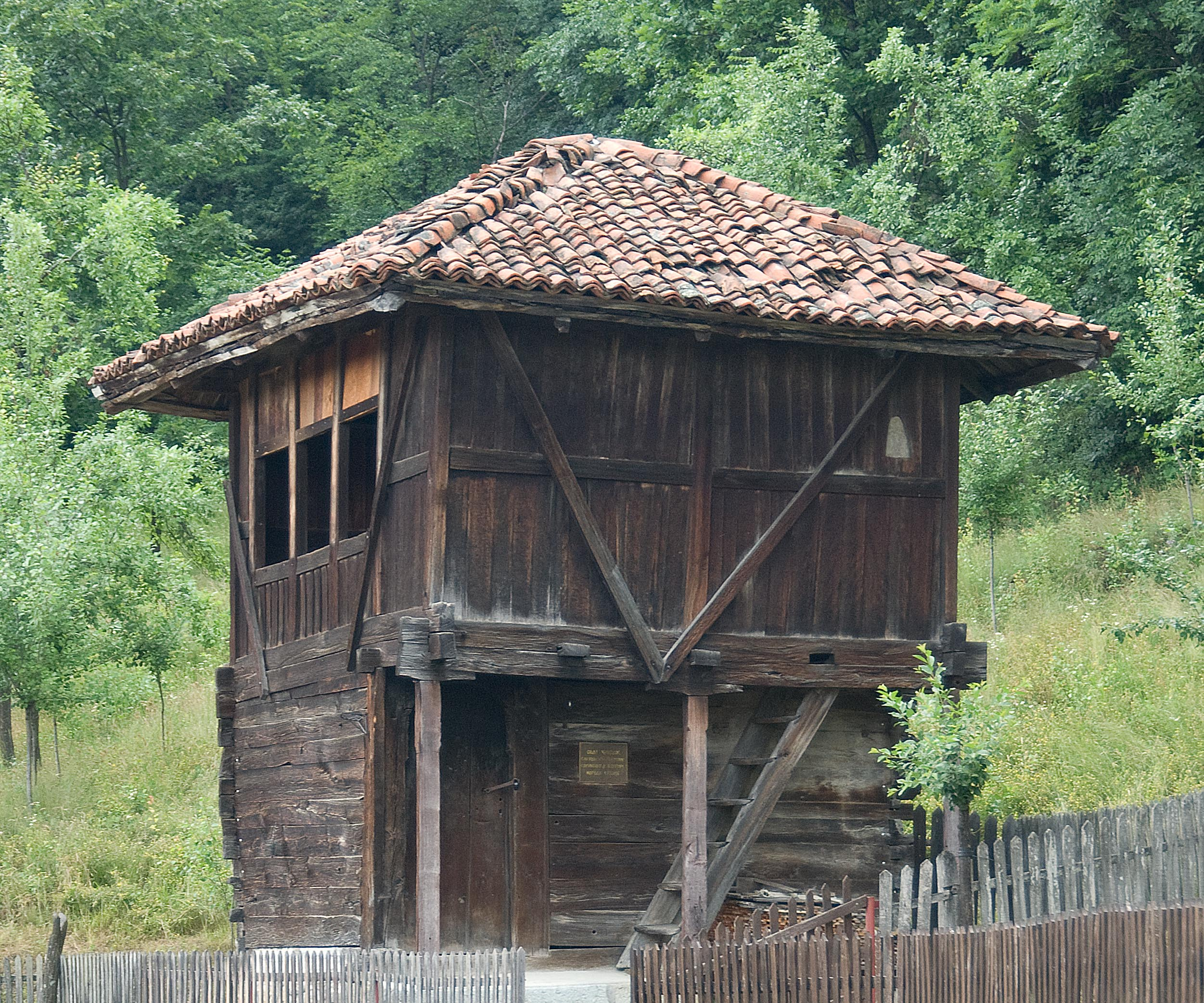
Chardak, constructed in 1771

A chardak (Bosnian and Croatian: čardak; Bulgarian, Macedonian and Serbian: чардак, čardak) is an old typical house in the Balkans. It is derived from Ottoman Turkish çardak. This term seems to have had various meanings, including an open hall of a house's upper living floor, a balcony, a porch, a summer house, or a raised, roofed structure.

In Hungary, csárdák were initially simple roadside shelters for travellers, but developed to become inns or taverns associated with folk music, folk dance, and traditional food.

The term chardak was also applied to defensive blockhouses built in the same style which were placed as guard posts on important roadways between the Ottoman, Habsburg, and Venetian territorial holdings of the Western Balkans.

== Description ==
A chardak is timber-framed and usually includes a hayat. The design has been described as "Greek-Oriental," Southern European," and "Mediterranean". It has a fortified ground floor and a wooden upper floor. This dwelling was used as a protective small fort.

Chardak can also refer to the space – a part of the central hall area – that connects the rooms of the house.
