= Mitar =

Mitar (Cyrillic: Митар) is a masculine given name. It is a Serbian variant of the Greek name Demetrius. Notable people with the name include:

- Mitar Lukić (born 1957), Bosnian Serb former footballer and current manager of FK Sloga Doboj
- Mitar Markez (born 1990 in Sombor), Serbian handballer
- Mitar Mirić (born 1957), Serbian and former Yugoslav pop-folk singer
- Mitar Mrdić (born 1984), Bosnian judoka
- Mitar Mrkela (born 1965), Serbian retired football player, member of an Olympic medallist team in 1984
- Mitar Novaković (born 1981), Montenegrin footballer
- Mitar Pejović (born 1983), Serbian football goalkeeper
- Mitar Peković (born 1981), Serbian footballer
- Mitar Subotić (1961–1999), known as Rex Ilusivii, Serbian-born musician and composer, producer in Brazil
- Mitar Vasiljević (born 1954), Bosnian Serb war criminal convicted by the International Criminal Tribunal for the Former Yugoslavia

== See also ==
- Mitrović
- Mitrovica (disambiguation)
- Mitrovac (disambiguation)
- Kitab al-Rawd al-Mitar, The Book of the Fragrant Garden, is a fifteenth-century Arabic geography by Muhammad bin Abd al-Munim al-Himyari
- Mita (disambiguation)
- Mkhitar
