= Zaovine Lake =

Artificial lake on Tara Mountain, Zlatibor, Serbia

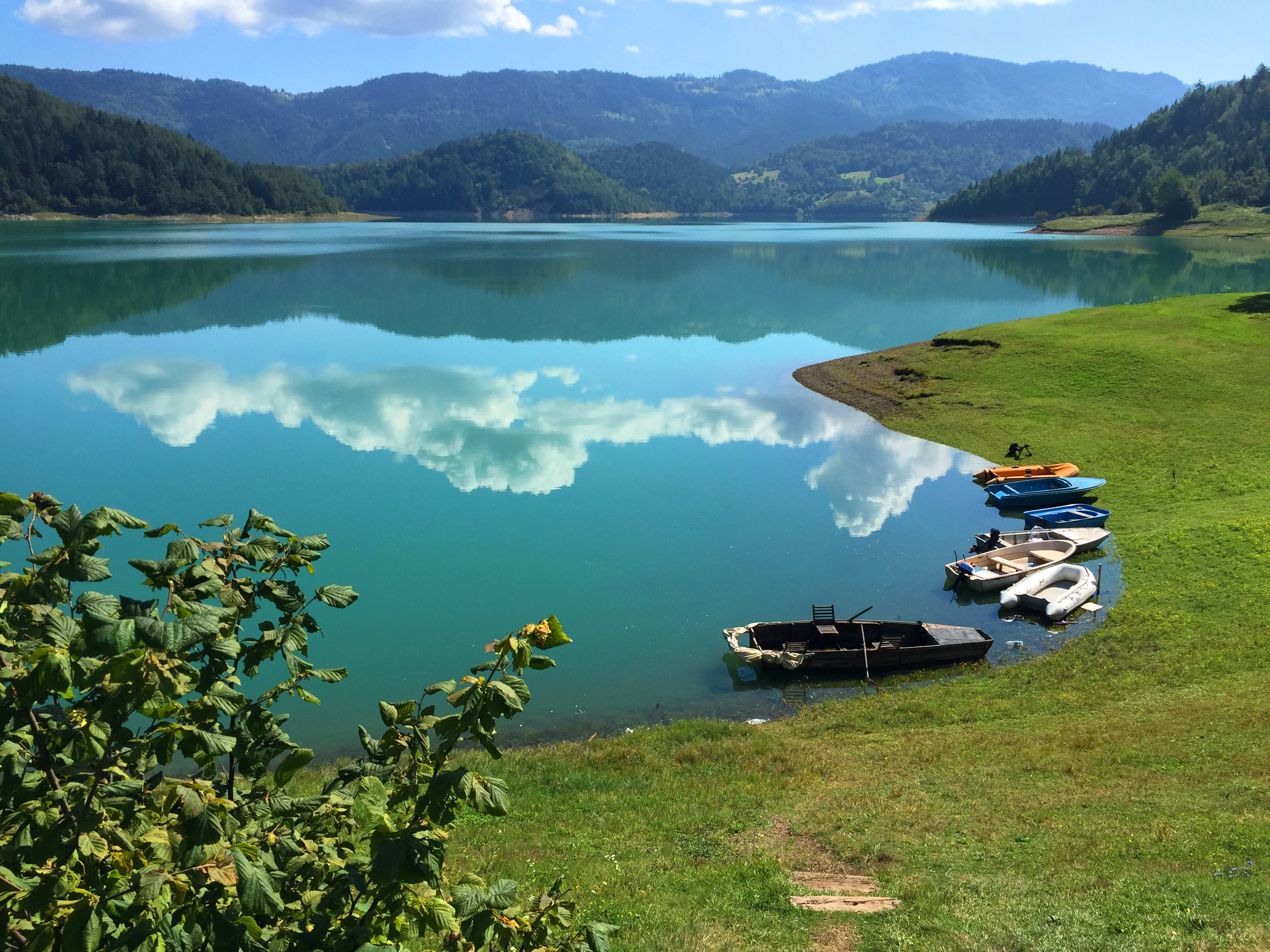
- Panoramic view

- Location within Serbia
- Location: Tara Mountain, Zlatibor District
- Coordinates: 43.87°N 19.40°E
- Type: artificial
- Primary inflows: Beli Rzav
- Primary outflows: Beli Rzav
- Basin countries: Serbia
- Surface area: 15 km^{2} (5.8 sq mi)
- Average depth: 80 m (260 ft)
- Max. depth: 110 m (360 ft)
- Water volume: 15 hm^{3} (12,000 acre⋅ft)
- Surface elevation: 892 to 958 m (2,927 to 3,143 ft)
- Settlements: Zaovine

Zaovine Lake (Serbian: Заовинско језеро, romanized: Zaovinsko jezero) is an artificial lake in central-west Serbia, on the Tara Mountain. It was created on the Beli Rzav river as a reservoir for the Bajina Bašta II reversible hydro power plant. The lake, with its five bays, has been nicknamed the "Jewel of Tara".

== Location ==
Zaovine Lake is located on the southern slopes of the Tara Mountain, in the direction of the Zvijezda mountain, which marks the border between Serbia and Bosnia and Herzegovina. It spreads out between the villages of Zaovine to the south-west and Mitrovac, a major tourist resort on Tara, to the north-east.

== Origin ==
Zaovine Lake was created between 1975 and 1983. The Beli Rzav river, one of tributaries of the Rzav river, was dammed with a 125-metre (410 ft) high dam and an artificial lake was created as the reservoir for the Bajina Bašta II reversible hydroelectrical power plant (630 MW). It is connected to the Drina river. Vežanje, the central hamlet of the village of Zaovine which gave its name to the lake, was flooded by the reservoir.

== Characteristics ==
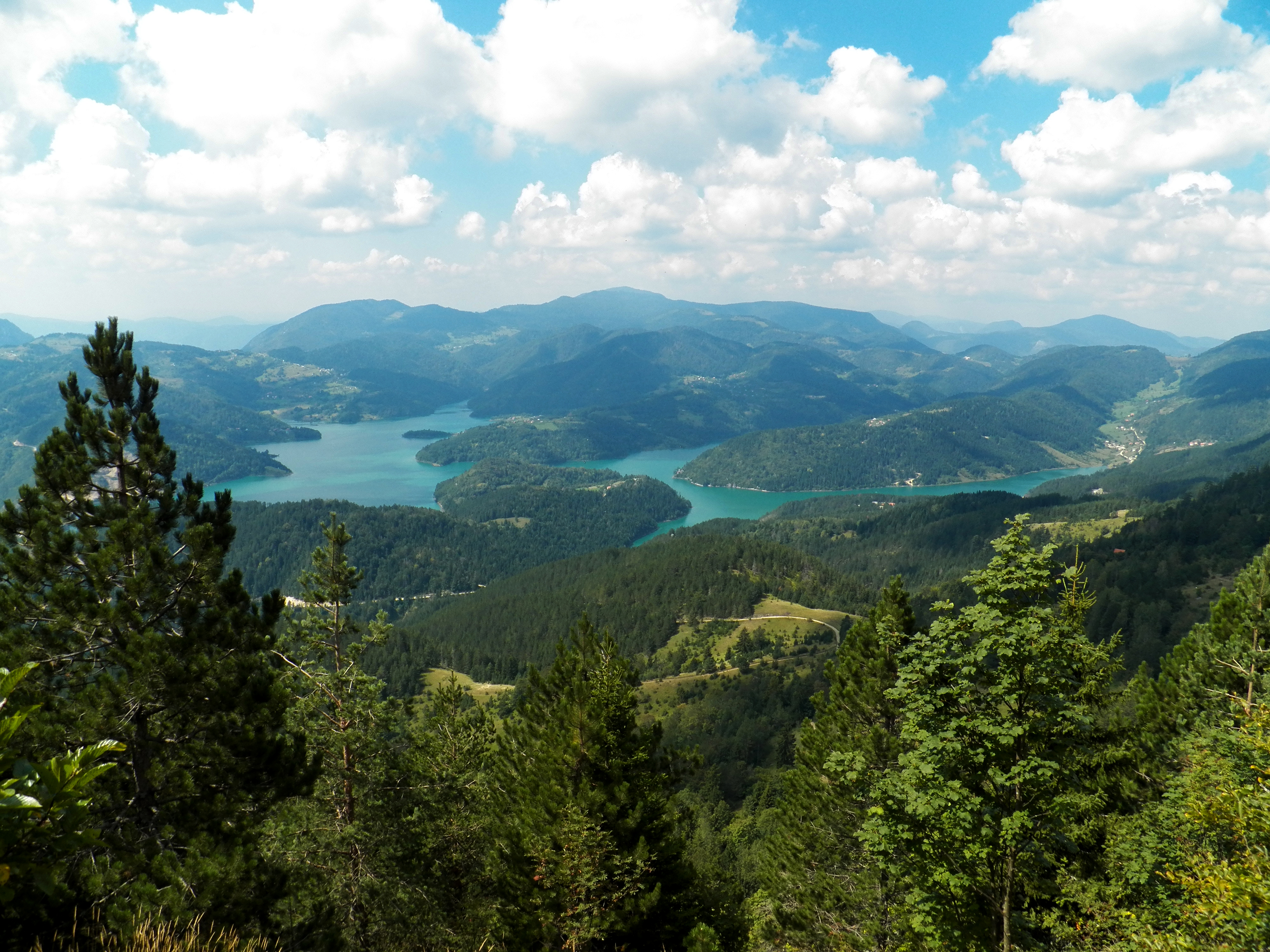
Aerial view on Zaovine Lake

The lake covers an area of 15 square kilometres (5.8 sq mi) and has five branches, or bays. When the Drina river has a high water level or during the rainy seasons, water from the Drina is pumped into the Zaovine Lake through an 8 kilometres (5.0 mi) pipeline. During converse conditions, water runs back from the Zaovine Lake into the Drina, producing electricity by turning the turbines inside the pipeline. There are also five mini-lakes in the area (Spajića, Malo Zaovinsko, etc.) from which the water is also pumped into Zaovine Lake. At full capacity, the water stored in the Zaovine alone allows for the Bajina Bašta hydro to operate for 20 days.

The road connecting Zaovine and Mitrovac bounds the northern side of the lake. The shores of the lake are seeing increasing numbers of visitors, fishermen and campers as summer houses are being built.

The maximum depth of the lake is 110 m (360 ft). The water is of such good quality that it does not need the full industrial purification in order to be used for drinking. The lake surface is known for its striking, blue color.

In the immediate proximity of the lake the photovoltaic solar power plant "Brana Lazići" was built. Location, at an altitude of 880 m (2,890 ft), was chosen in 2014 when the conceptual design was also drafted. The first 110 kWh became operational in 2016, with the remaining 220 kWh added in 2017, bringing the total installed capacity to 330 kWh. The plant has 1.152 solar panels which cover 5,700 m^{2} (61,000 sq ft).

The lake is accessible from the directions of Kaluđerske Bare and Perućac, by the curvy roads through the surrounding conifer forests. The entire lake is encircled by the paved road, which connects all five bays. In the vicinity are also several scenic viewpoints, mountaineering paths, everglades and several preserved old wooden cabins (brvnare).

== 2019 draining ==
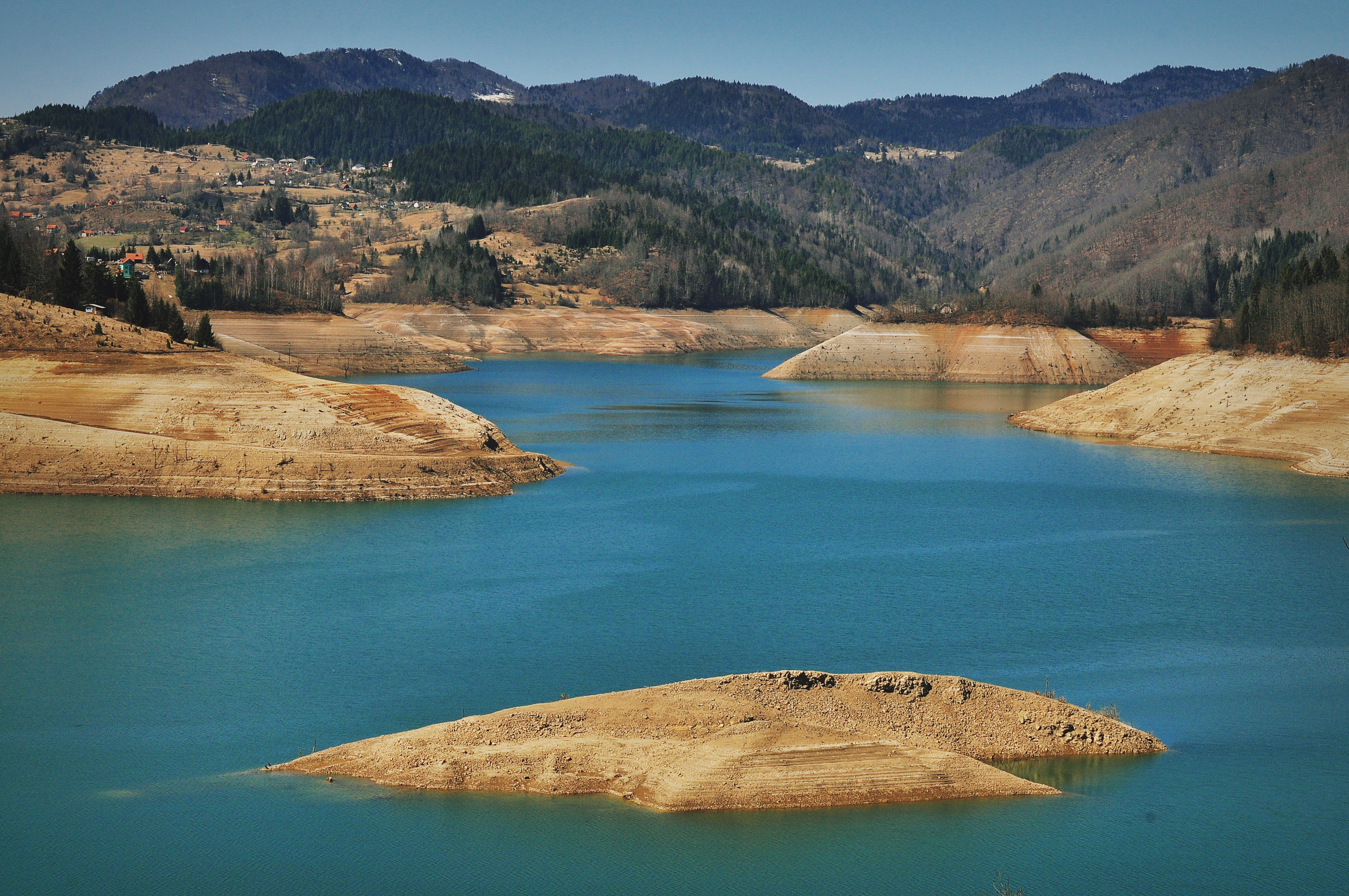
Lake Zaovine in March 2017.

In early April 2019, numerous media reported about the massive draining of the lake. A large amount of water was drained from the reservoir in the period of 15 days. The Jelisavčići bay, 20 m (66 ft) deep at the normal water level, drained to the point that it could be walked over on foot. The entire lake was reduced to a stream, as the water level plunged 40 m (130 ft).

Complaints came from the local population, tourists, environmentalists, fishermen, excursionists and the representatives of the Tara National Park, who claimed that such fluctuation will damage wildlife, especially the fish population, as the lake is a spawning area. The empty lake became a national news, especially after the exposed, muddy banks triggered landslides down from the 300 m (980 ft) tall hills above the lake. The area affected by landslides spread to 30 ha (74 acres), crumbling and tilting 21 houses and destroying roads, communal infrastructure, meadows and forests. The park authorities declared sections of the lake unsafe.

Despite all the evidence to the contrary, the state-owned electric utility power company Elektroprivreda Srbije (EPS) maintained that they were not emptying the lake and that the situation was normal. After strong public and media reaction, the EPS began to pump water back into the lake. However, this happened after similar abrupt draining of other large reservoirs, like the Vlasina Lake in the summer of 2018, Lake Zavoj in 2018 or the Uvac Lake in November 2018. These lakes are also in the protected areas and the EPS claimed that everything was normal, while the local population accused them of forcing the electricity production and selling it on the black market. In the case of the Zaovine Lake, representative of the Tara National Park admitted that the "interest of the EPS differs from the interest of the park", while one of the local EPS managers stated that the "EPS commercial sector has to act according to the market".

The EPS also claimed that the mass wasting area already existed and was prone to landsliding anyway. The area was known for the mass wasting, but it was dormant since before 2000, as the water level was stable. National park departments estimated that the damage, both the material and environmental, especially for the fish life in the lake, is major.

== Wildlife ==
The entire lake lies in the Tara National Park, one of five in Serbia. The lake is surrounded by vast woods as forestation of Tara mountain is 75%. Zaovine is the area where Josif Pančić, a leading Serbian botanist, discovered the endemic Serbian spruce in 1875 on the nearby Kik hill. The hill was destroyed in the early 1980s and material was used for building the dam that created Zaovine Lake. There are over 600 plant species in the area surrounding the lake, of which 15 are protected by law, including the Serbian spruce and edelweiss. Wildlife includes chamois.

There are 14 species of fish living in the lake, including nase, rainbow trout, European chub, Danube Roach, common barbel and European perch.
