= Mitrović =

Mitrović or Mitrovich (Serbian Cyrillic: Митровић, pronounced [mǐtroʋitɕ]) is a Serbian surname, derived from the male given name Mitar (a version of the Slavic name Dimitar or Dimitrije). It may refer to:

== Mitrović ==
- Aleksandar Mitrović (basketball) (born 1990), Serbian professional basketball player
- Aleksandar Mitrović (footballer) (born 1994), Serbian professional footballer
- Aleksandar Mitrović (politician) (1933–2012), former Deputy Prime Minister of Yugoslavia
- Aleksandar Mitrović (volleyball) (born 1982), Serbian volleyball player
- Branislav Mitrović (born 1985), Serbian water polo player
- Dalibor Mitrović (born 1977), Serbian football striker
- Danilo Mitrović (born 2001), Serbian footballer
- Dejan Mitrović (born 1973), retired Serbian football player
- Draženko Mitrović (born 1979), Paralympian athlete from Serbia
- Janko Mitrović (died 1659), Serbian military commander in Venetian service
- Lazar Mitrović (footballer, born 1993), Serbian footballer
- Lazar Mitrović (footballer, born 1998), Serbian footballer
- Luka Mitrović (born 1993), Serbian basketball player
- Marko Mitrović (footballer, born 1978), Serbian football coach
- Marko Mitrović (footballer, born 1992), Swedish footballer
- Matej Mitrović (born 1993), Croatian football player
- Milan Mitrović (born 1988), Serbian football player
- Milorad Mitrović (footballer, born 1908) (1908–1993), Serbian football defender
- Milorad Mitrović (footballer, born 1949), Serbian professional football coach and player
- Milorad Mitrović (poet) (1867–1907), Serbian poet
- Nemanja Mitrović, multiple people
- Nenad Mitrović (footballer, born 1980), Serbian footballer
- Nenad Mitrović (footballer, born 1998), Serbian football goalkeeper
- Nikola Mitrović (born 1987), Serbian footballer
- Radovan Mitrović (born 1992), footballer
- Romeo Mitrović (born 1979), Bosnian Croat football player
- Slaviša Mitrović (born 1977), Bosnian Serb football player
- Srećko Mitrović (born 1984), Australian football player of Serbian descent
- Stefan Mitrović (footballer, born 1990), Serbian footballer
- Stefan Mitrović (footballer, born August 2002), Serbian footballer
- Stefan Mitrović (water polo) (born 1988), Serbian water polo player
- Žika Mitrović (1921–2005), Serbian and Yugoslav film director and screenwriter

== Mitrovich ==
- Daniel S. Mitrovich (fl. 1989), business associate of Seymour Heller
- Giorgio Mitrovich (1795–1885), Maltese politician
- José Emilio Mitrovich (born 1947), Guatemalan footballer

== See also ==
- Mitrinović
- Meštrović
- Mitrovica (disambiguation)
- Mitrovtsi
- Wratislaw von Mitrowitz, Bohemian noble family
