= Arboretum Mustila =

Finland arboretum

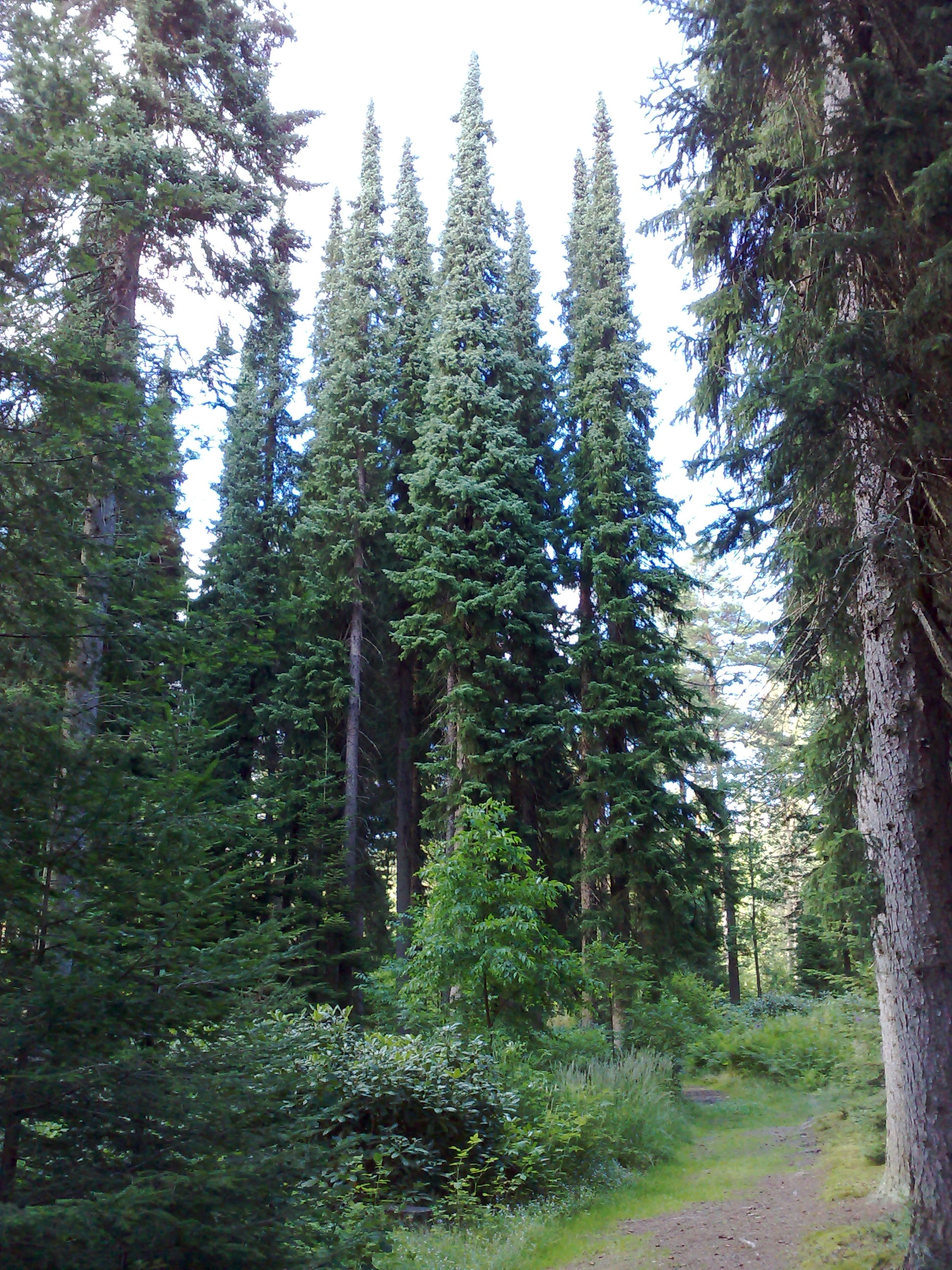
- Group of Picea omorika at Mustila
- Interactive map of Arboretum Mustila
- Type: Arboretum and public park
- Location: Finland
- Coordinates: 60°43′51″N 26°25′28″E
- Area: 120 hectares (300 acres)
- Created: 1902
- Open: Yes

Arboretum Mustila is an arboretum near Elimäki in southern Finland.

The arboretum was founded in 1902 and is today maintained by a trust. At its inception it was intended as a testing ground for foreign species of conifers. Today it contains slightly less than 100 species of conifers and over 200 species of broad-leaved tree, in addition to other plants. Several of the trees are arranged in larger groups (forest plots) rather than as individual specimens. Arboretum Mustila's collection of rhododendrons and azaleas is also notable. The many species of trees occasionally attract locally rare birds, e.g. spotted nutcracker and two-barred crossbill. The arboretum is open to visitors for a fee and contains several walkways.
