= Mitrovice =

Mitrovice may refer to:

- Mitrovicë, a town in Kosovo
- Nové Mitrovice, a village in the Czech Republic
- Mitrovice,^{[cs]} a village in Mezno Municipality, Benešov District, Czech Republic

== See also ==
- Mitrovica (disambiguation)
