= Kaarina Dromberg =

Finnish politician (born 1942)

Ritva Kaarina Dromberg (née Hakula; born 22 May 1942 in Elimäki) is a Finnish politician. She served as Minister of Culture from 5 June 2002 to 17 July 2003. She was a member of the Parliament of Finland from 1983 to 2007, representing the National Coalition Party. She helped create the Network of Finnish Women Members of Parliament.
