= Osmo Puhakka =

Finnish politician (born 1948)

Osmo Heikki Puhakka (born 1 January 1948 in Elimäki) is a Finnish Lutheran clergyman and politician. He was a member of the Parliament of Finland from 1999 to 2003, representing the Centre Party.
