= Mitrovac =

Mitrovac may refer to:

- Mitrovac, Serbia, a village near Bajina Bašta, Serbia
- Mitrovac, Osijek-Baranja County, a village near Čeminac, Croatia
- Mitrovac, Požega-Slavonia County, a village near Kutjevo, Croatia
