= Rzav (Drina) =

Rzav Рзав (Serbian)
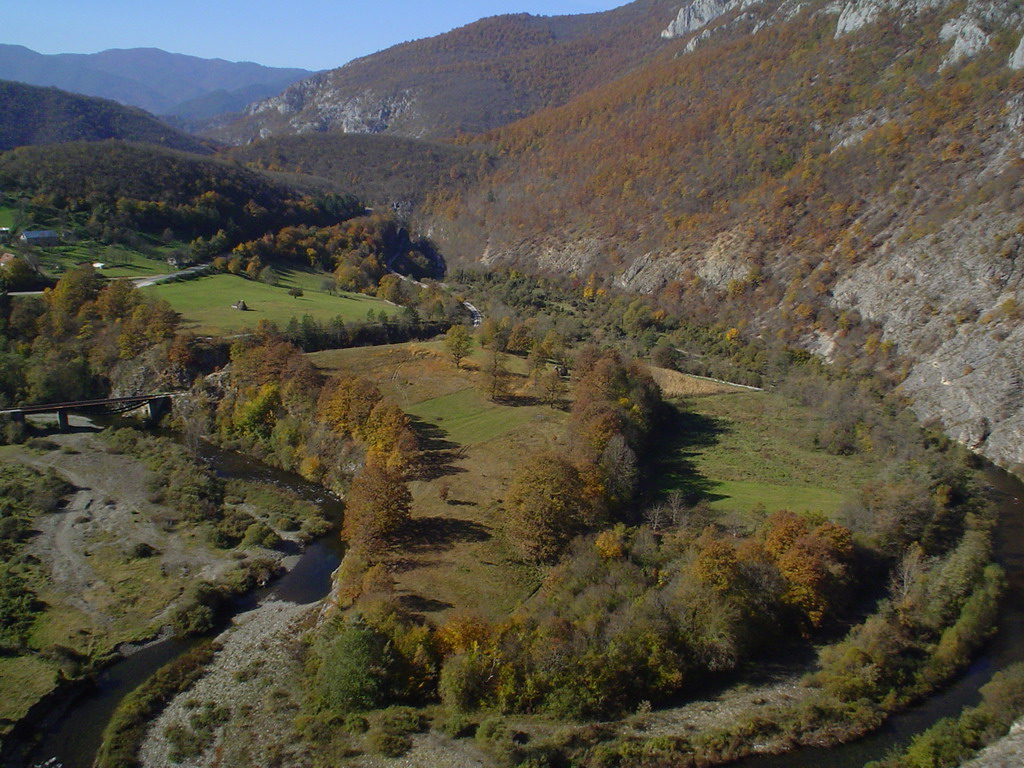
- The Rzav near village Vardište

- Location within Bosnia and Herzegovina

Location
- Country: Serbia, Bosnia and Herzegovina

Physical characteristics
- Source
  - location: Čigota (Zlatibor, as the Black Rzav) mountain, west Serbia
- Mouth
  - location: Drina river, at Višegrad, Bosnia and Herzegovina
  - coordinates: 43.7879°N 19.2945°E
- Length: 72 km (45 mi)
- Basin size: 605 km^{2} (234 sq mi)

Basin features
- Progression: Drina→ Sava→ Danube→ Black Sea

The Rzav (Serbian Cyrillic: Рзав) is a 72 km (45 mi) the river in eastern Bosnia and Herzegovina, the right tributary to the Drina river. It is created by two headstreams in the region of Donje Vardište, the Crni Rzav and the Beli Rzav, both of which originating from the western Serbia. The river is sometimes referred to as the Zlatiborski Rzav (Serbian Cyrillic: Златиборски Рзав; "Rzav of Zlatibor").

== Beli Rzav ==
The Beli Rzav (Bosnian: Bijeli Rzav, Serbian Cyrillic: Бели Рзав; "White Rzav") is the Rzav's shorter headstream. It originates from the eastern slopes of the Zvijezda mountain, close to the Bosnian border. After it passes the hills of Batura, it turns southward to the Tara mountain, receiving many small streams from both Tara and Zvijezda mountains. At the monastery and village of Zaovine, the Beli Rzav is dammed and the artificial Zaovine Lake is created. After crossing the village of Mokra Gora (hamlets Kršanje and Kotroman), the river turns west, enters Bosnia and Herzegovina and right across the border meets the Crni Rzav at the village of Donje Vardište.

== Crni Rzav ==
The Crni Rzav (Bosnian: Crni Rzav, Serbian Cyrillic: Црни Рзав; "Black Rzav"), is the Rzav's longer headstream. It originates from the Čigota mountain, eastern section of the Zlatibor mountain. The river originally flows northward, next to the villages of Vodice and Jokina Ćuprija, reaches the central section of the Zlatibor where it is dammed and creates the artificial Ribnica Lake (surface area of 10 km^{2}), after the nearby village of Ribnica. The reservoir was formed in 1971. After the lake, the river sharply turns west and soon gets followed by the parallel stream of the Jablanica river. After crossing the village of Mokra Gora (hamlet Panjak) on the Serbian-Bosnian border Crni Rzav meets the Jablanica river at the village Gornje Vardište and finally the river Beli Rzav at the village of Donje Vardište.

As one of the consequences of the ecological protests in various parts of Serbia since 2019, especially against the small hydros, a survey was conducted in western and central Serbia to check the effects of such facilities regarding the nature. The survey of nine streams was conducted by the Faculty for Natural and Mathematical Sciences in Kragujevac and local branch of the World Wide Fund for Nature, the WWF-Adria. The Crni Rzav was described as an "example of the river which, under the pressure from small hydros, completely lost the diversity of its wildlife and visual identity". The river's natural course was changed and its role in reducing the effects of the climate change was diminished. Troubling changes of the habitats were recorded, as a result of drastic reduction of the water quantity and overgrowth of algae which specifically affected the aquatic macroinvertebrate fauna.

== Rzav ==
The Rzav continues as the natural extension of the Beli Rzav, but since the Black Rzav is longer, the latter is considered to be the main headstream. It flows between the southernmost part of the Zvijezda mountain (Ponos peak) from the north and the Suha Gora mountain from the south, next to the villages of Prosjek (and ruins of the medieval city of the same name), Dobrun and Žagree, before it empties into the Drina at the town of Višegrad.

The Rzav drains an area of 605 km^{2}, belongs to the Black Sea drainage area and it is not navigable.

== See also ==
- List of rivers of Bosnia and Herzegovina
- Natural area Dobrun-Rzav

== Sources ==
- Mala Prosvetina Enciklopedija, Third edition (1985); Prosveta; ISBN 86-07-00001-2
- Jovan Đ. Marković (1990): Enciklopedijski geografski leksikon Jugoslavije; Svjetlost-Sarajevo; ISBN 86-01-02651-6
