= Elimäki =

Elimäki Elimä
- Former municipality
- Elimäen kunta Elimä kommun
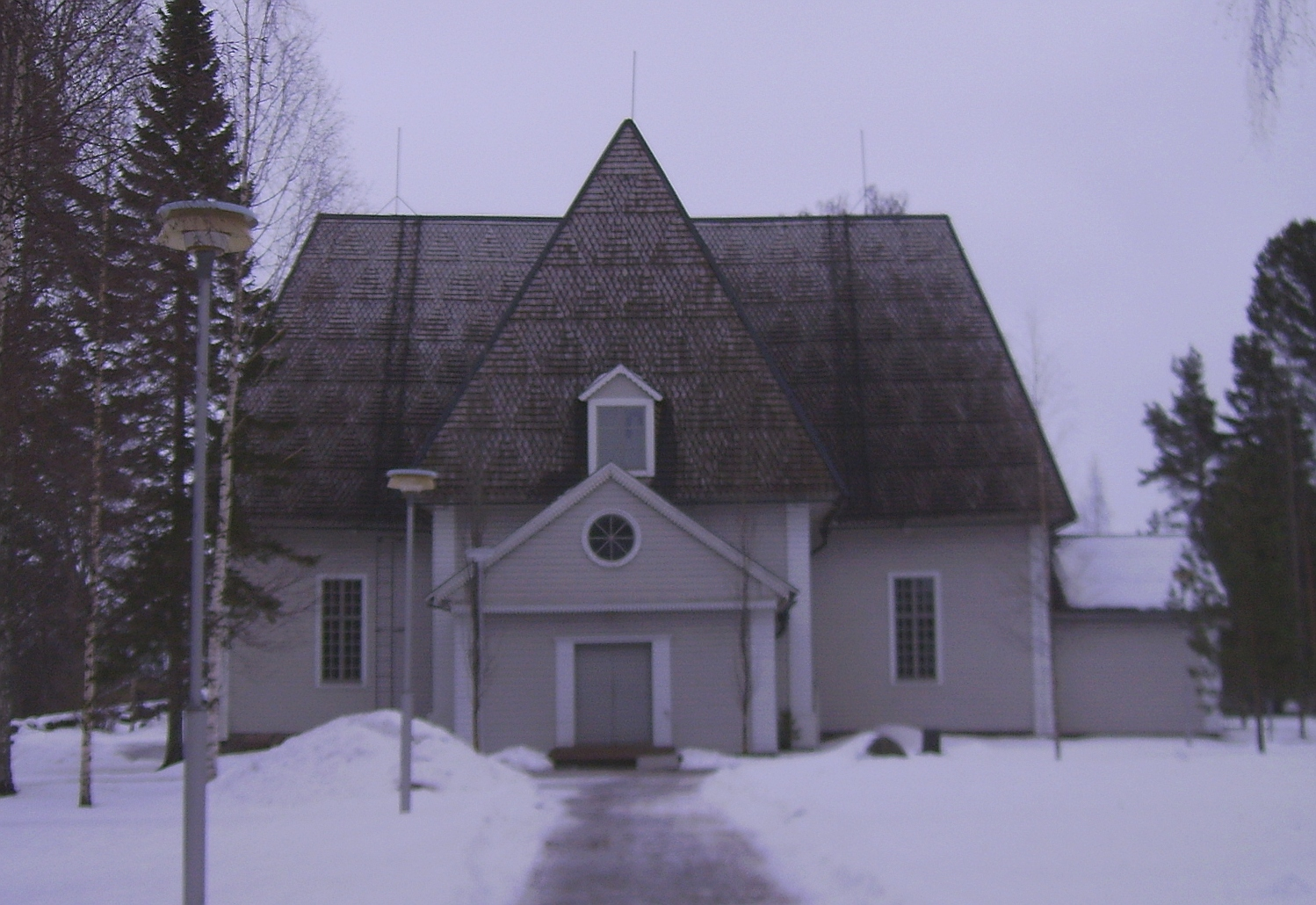
- Elimäki wooden church

- Coat of arms

- Location of Elimäki in Finland
- Coordinates: 60°43′N 026°27′E
- Country: Finland
- Region: Kymenlaakso
- Sub-region: Kouvola sub-region
- Consolidated: 2009

Area
  - Total: 391.74 km^{2} (151.25 sq mi)
  - Land: 387.47 km^{2} (149.60 sq mi)
  - Water: 4.27 km^{2} (1.65 sq mi)

Population (2008-12-31)
  - Total: 8,199
  - Density: 21.16/km^{2} (54.81/sq mi)
- Time zone: UTC+2 (EET)
  - Summer (DST): UTC+3 (EEST)

Elimäki (Finnish: [ˈeliˌmæki]; Swedish: Elimä) is a former municipality of Finland.

It was located in the province of Southern Finland and was part of the region of Kymenlaakso. The municipality had a population of 8,199 and covered an area of 391.74 km² of which 4.27 km² was water. The population density was 21.2 inhabitants per km².

The municipality was unilingually Finnish.

Of note is the village of Koria, the largest village in Elimäki, possessing a population of 5,100. Koria is located 6,7 km west of Kouvola.

As of 2009, the six municipalities – Kouvola, Kuusankoski, Elimäki, Anjalankoski, Valkeala and Jaala – were consolidated, accounting for the new municipality of Kouvola with a population of over 80,000, being the 10th largest city in Finland.

Arboretum Mustila is located near Elimäki.

== People born in Elimäki ==
- Jenny af Forselles (1869 – 1938)
- Väinö Kajander (1893 – 1978)
- Ilmari Salminen (1902 – 1986)
- Erkki Pakkanen (1930 – 1973)
- Kaarina Dromberg (1942 – )
- Jarmo Wasama (1943 – 1966)
- Osmo Puhakka (1948 – )
- Pentti Sinersaari (1956 – )
- Tuija Toivonen (1958 – )
- Anita Lehtola-Tollin (1967 – )
