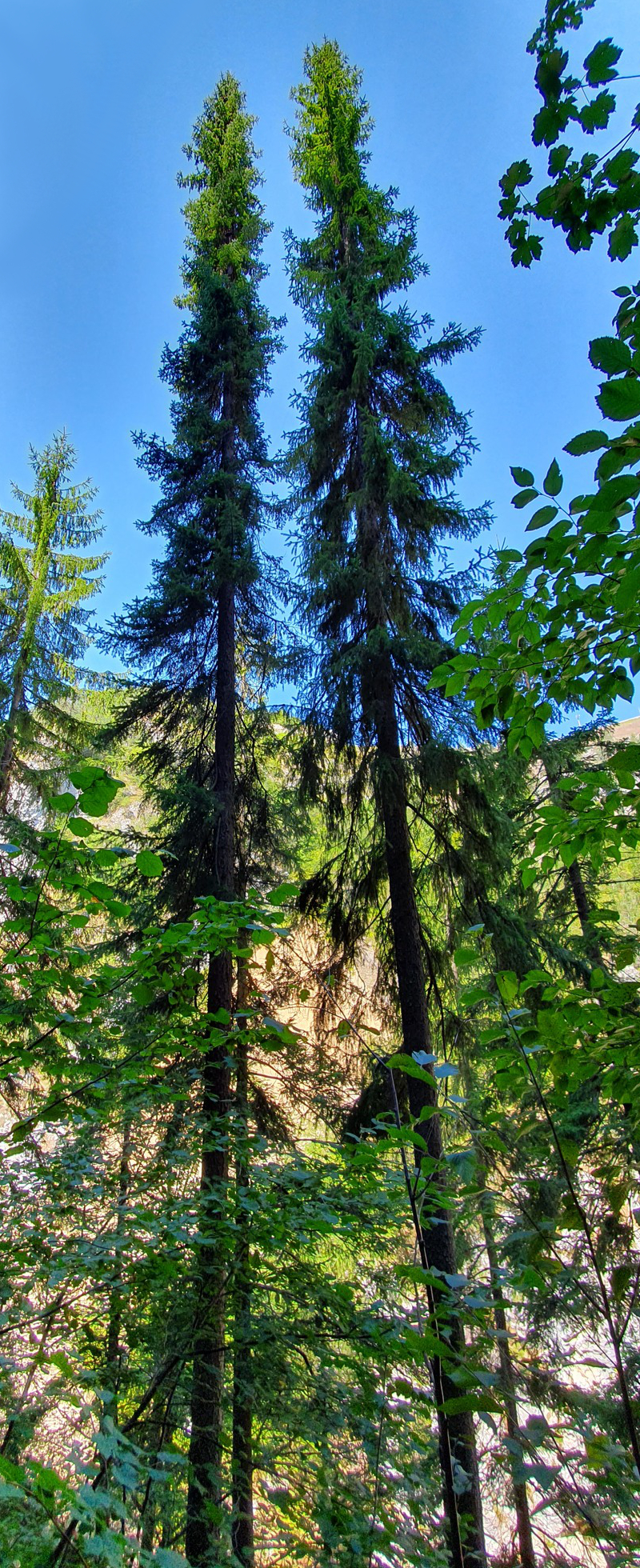
- In its native range near Zaovine, Serbia. Note the extremely slender crown.

Conservation status
- Endangered (IUCN 3.1)

Scientific classification
- Kingdom: Plantae
- Clade: Tracheophytes
- Clade: Gymnospermae
- Division: Pinophyta
- Class: Pinopsida
- Order: Pinales
- Family: Pinaceae
- Genus: Picea
- Species: P. omorika

Binomial name
- Picea omorika (Pančić) Purk.
- Continuous range ✖ Isolated population

= Picea omorika =

Serbian spruce

Species of conifer

Picea omorika, the Serbian spruce (in Serbian: Панчићева оморика, Pančićeva omorika, pronounced [pâːnt͡ʃit͡ɕɛv̞a ɔmɔ̌rika], "Pančić's spruce"), is a species of coniferous tree endemic to the Drina River valley in western Serbia, and eastern Bosnia and Herzegovina, with a total range of only about 60 ha, at 800–1,600 m (2,600–5,200 ft) altitude. It was originally discovered near the Serbian village of Zaovine, on Mount Tara, in 1875, and named by the Serbian botanist Josif Pančić; the specific epithet omorika is simply the Serbian word for the tree (other spruces are smrča in Serbian).

== Description ==
It is a medium-sized evergreen tree growing to 20 m (66 ft) tall, exceptionally 33 m (110 ft), with a trunk diameter of up to 0.7 m (2 ft), and a conic crown; the crown is very narrow on high altitude trees, broader at lower altitudes. The shoots are buff-brown, and densely pubescent (hairy). The leaves are needle-like, 10–20 mm long, flattened in cross-section, dark green above, and with two glaucous blue-white stomatal stripes below. The cones are 4–7 cm (2–3 in) long, fusiform (spindle-shaped, broadest in the middle), dark purple (almost black) when young, maturing dark brown 5–7 months after pollination, with stiff scales.

The tallest specimen in the wild currently known is 30.2 m tall; older claims of trees up to 50 m tall are now unverifiable. In cultivation, the tallest currently known is 33 m tall, in the Arboretum Mustila in Finland, with another not far behind at 31.5 m at Murthly Castle in Scotland.

== Ecology ==
Because of its limited range, it is not a major source of nutrition to wildlife, but does provide cover for birds and small mammals. Prior to the Pleistocene ice ages, it had a much larger range throughout most of Europe.

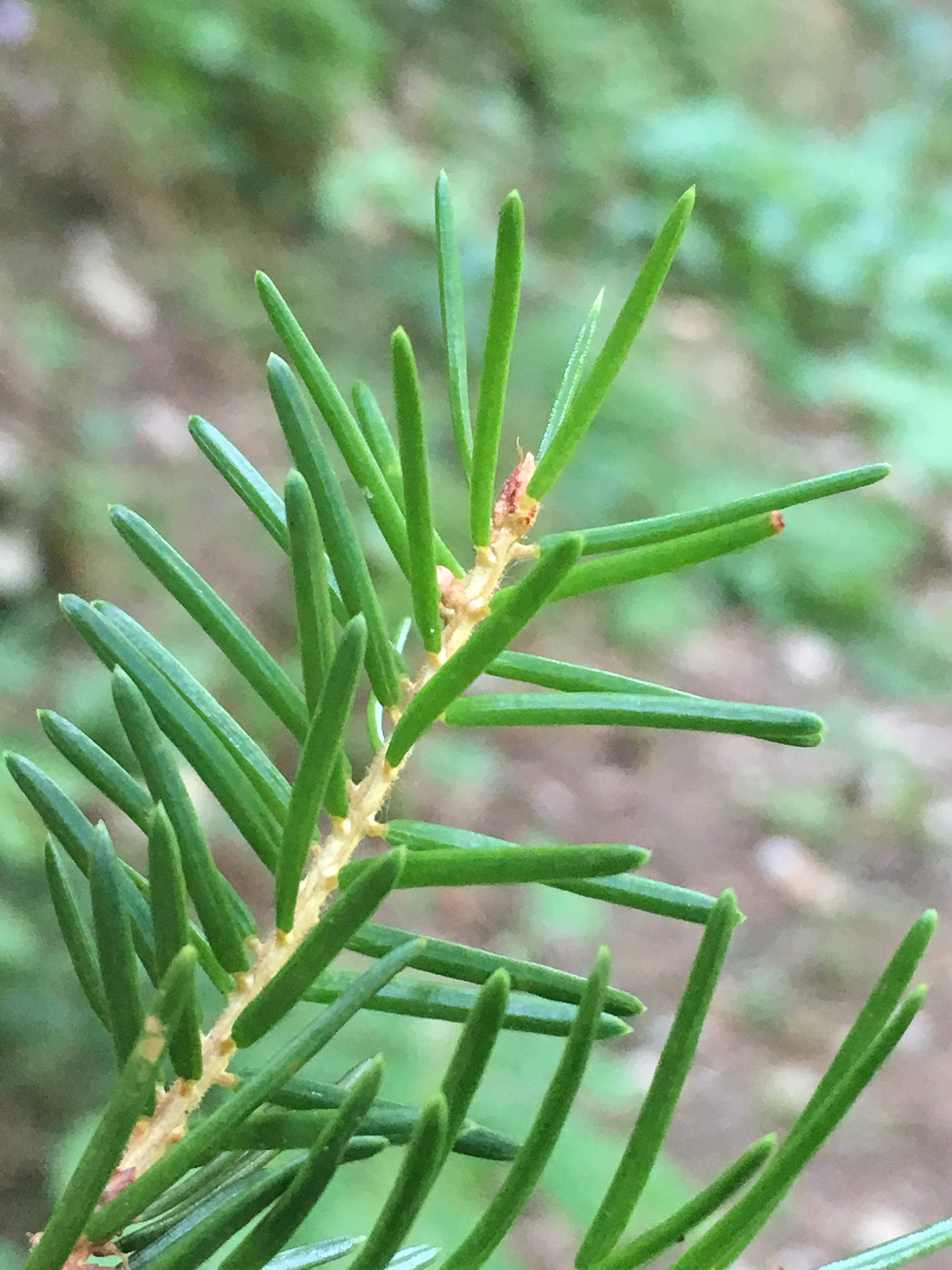
Foliage, showing the glossy green upper side of the needles

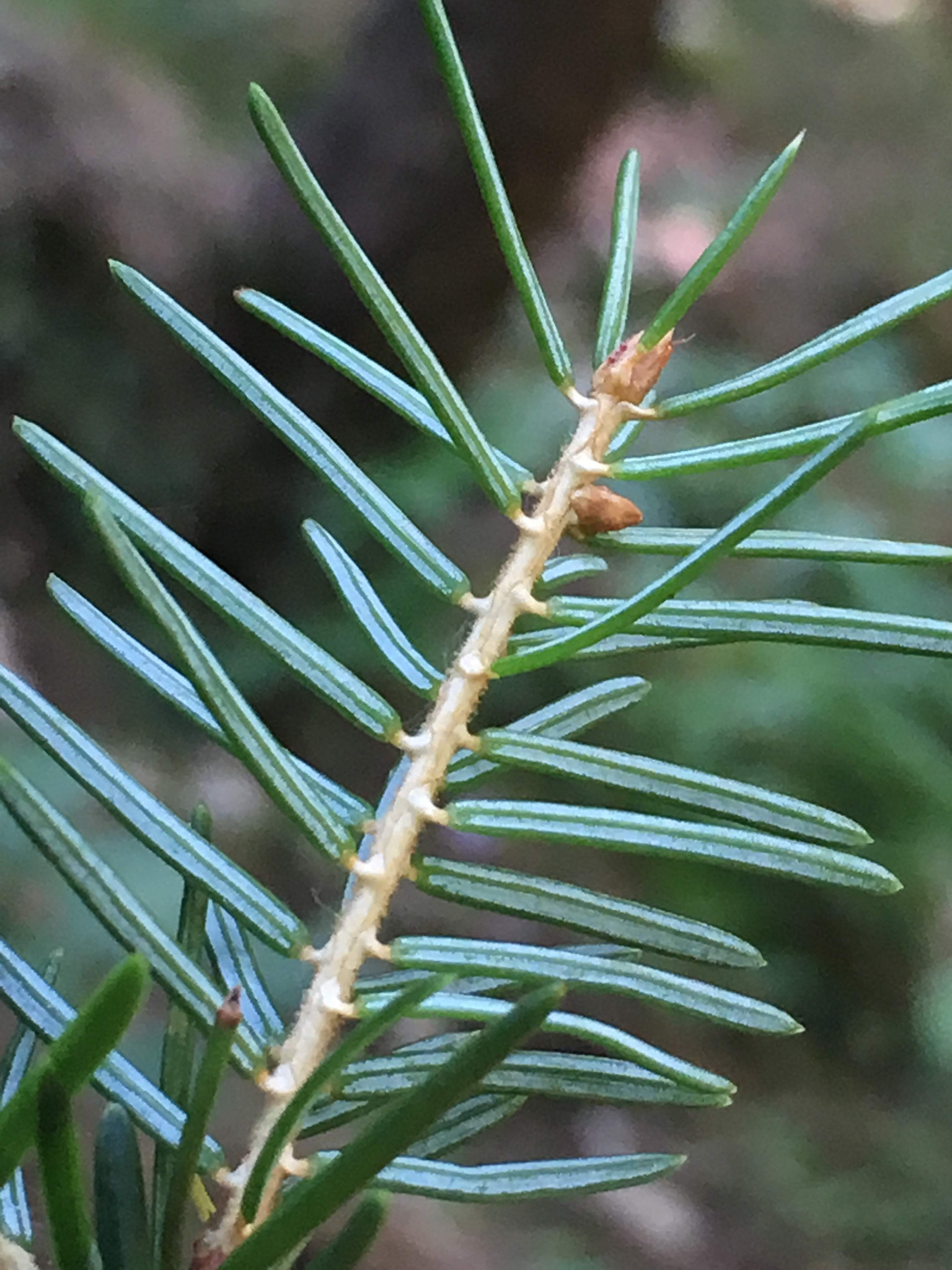
Foliage, showing the glaucous blue-green stomatal stripes on the underside of needles

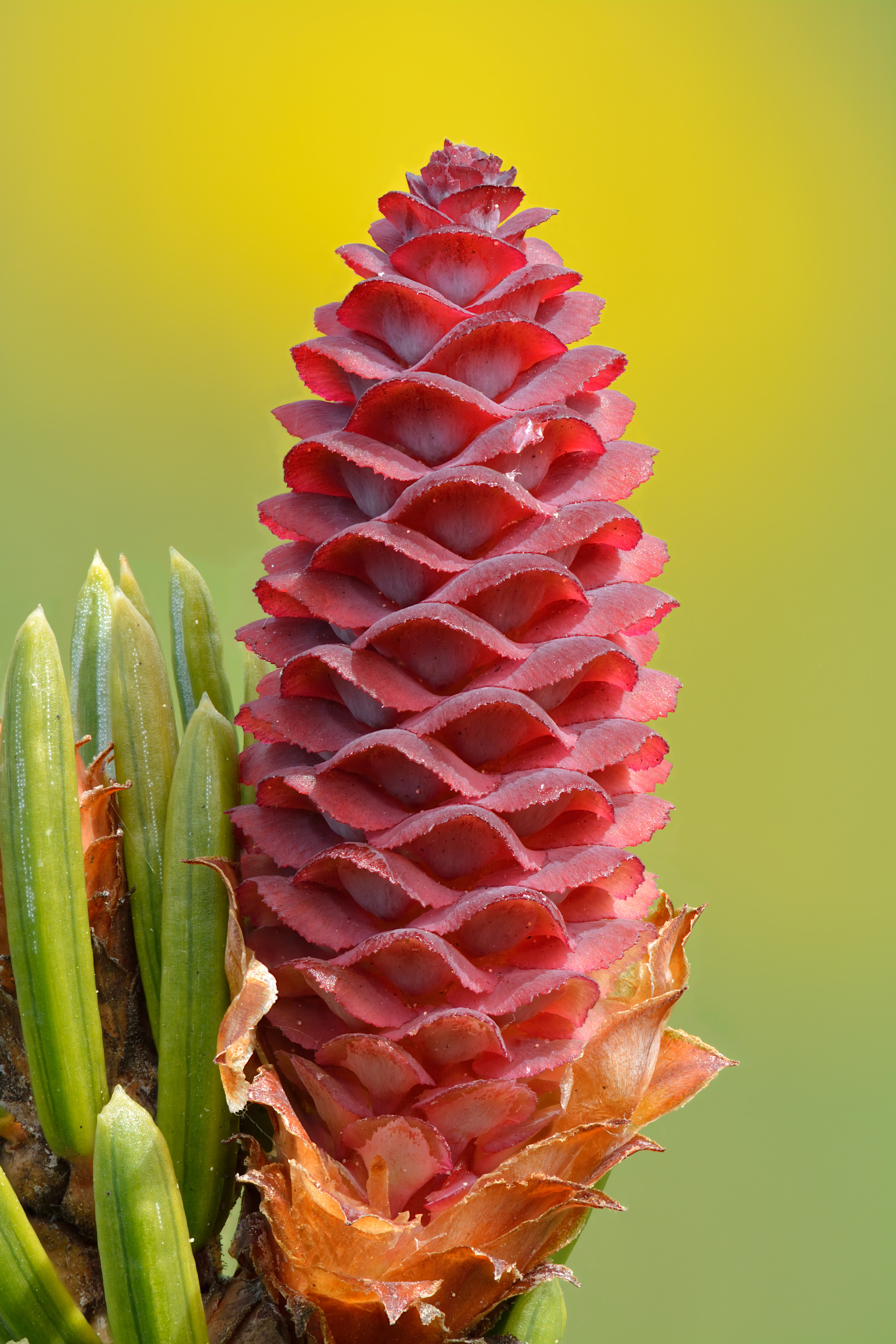
Immature female cone

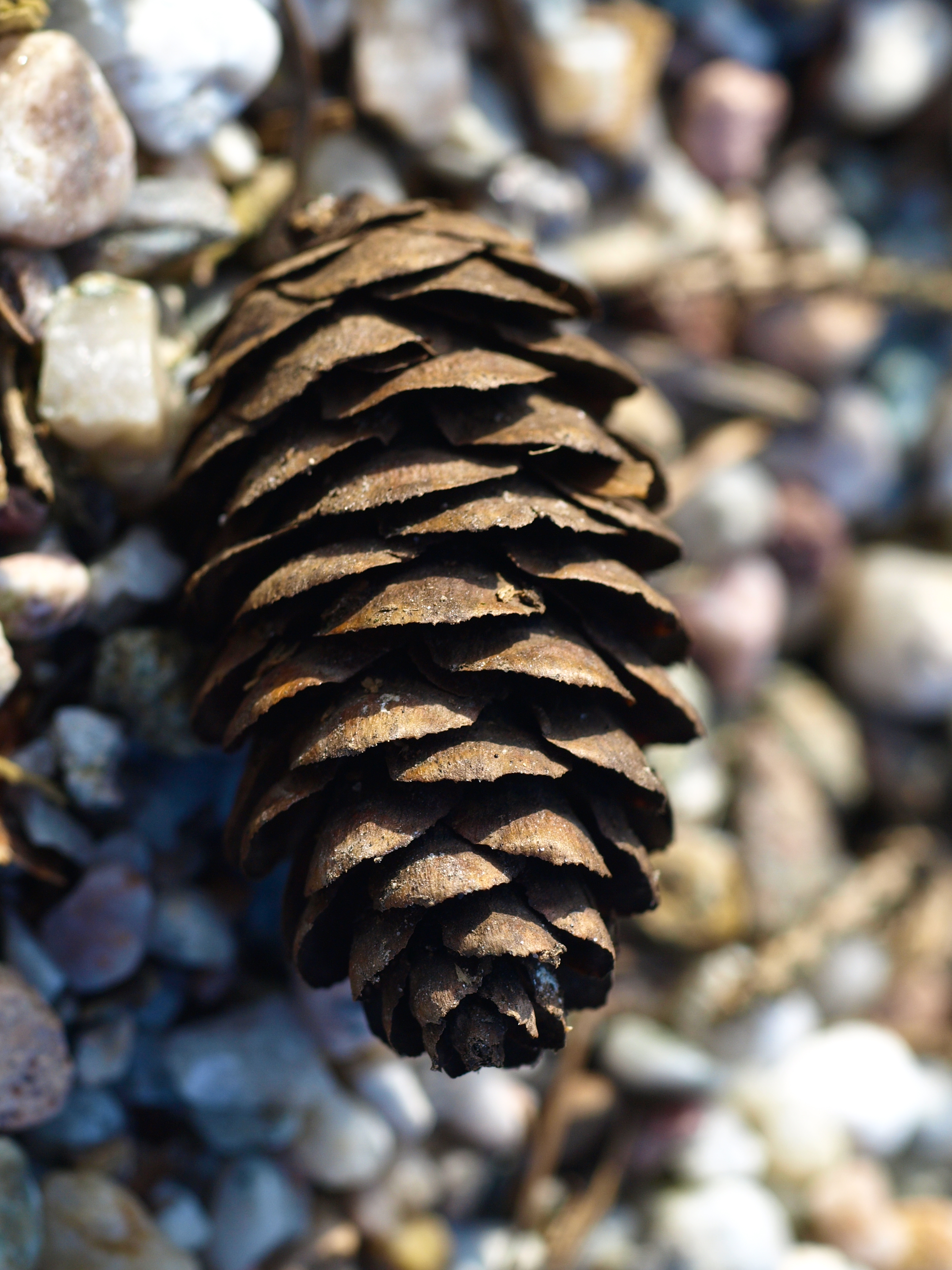
Mature female cone

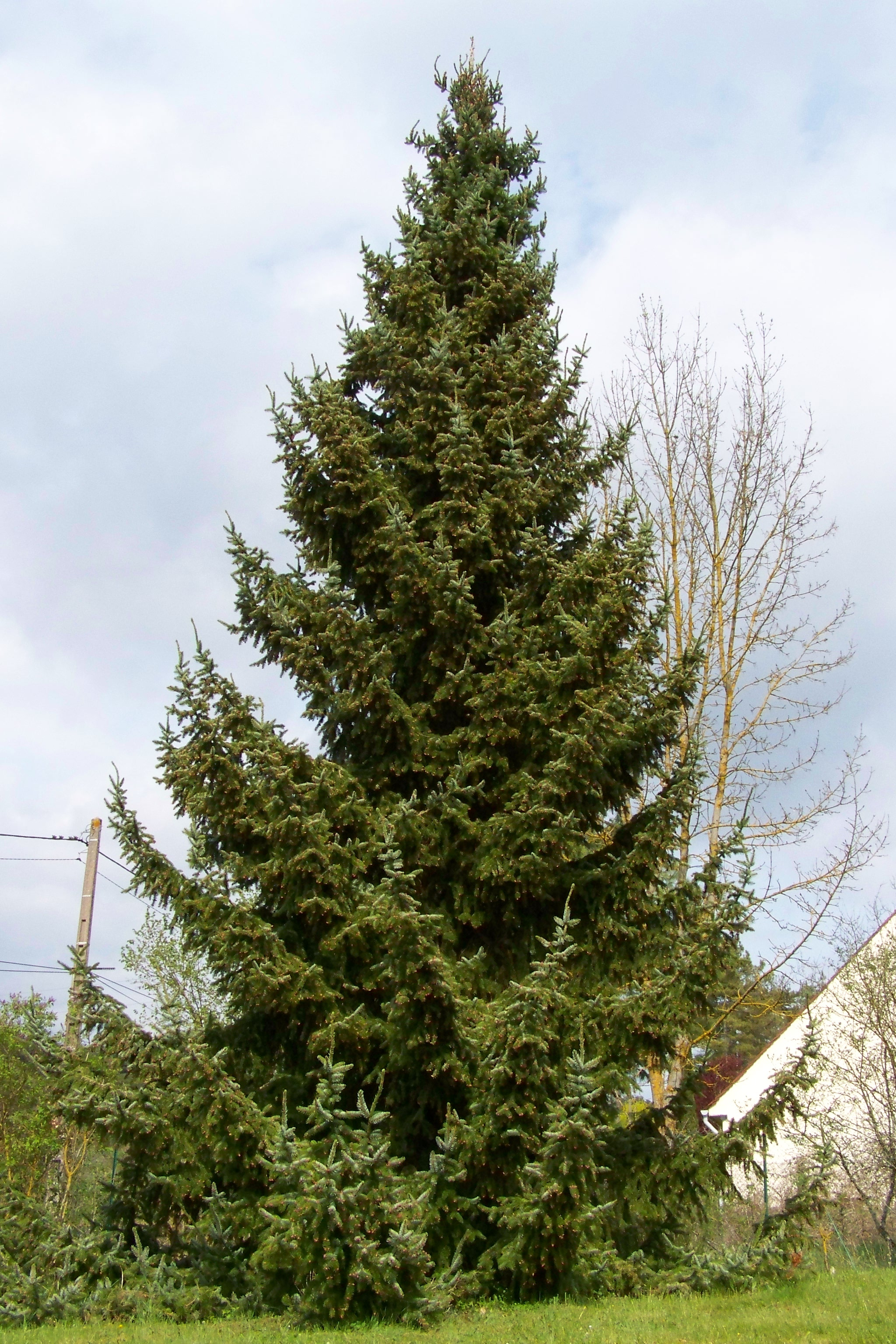
Although some trees are very slender, this is not invariable; many are broader, such as this cultivated tree in France

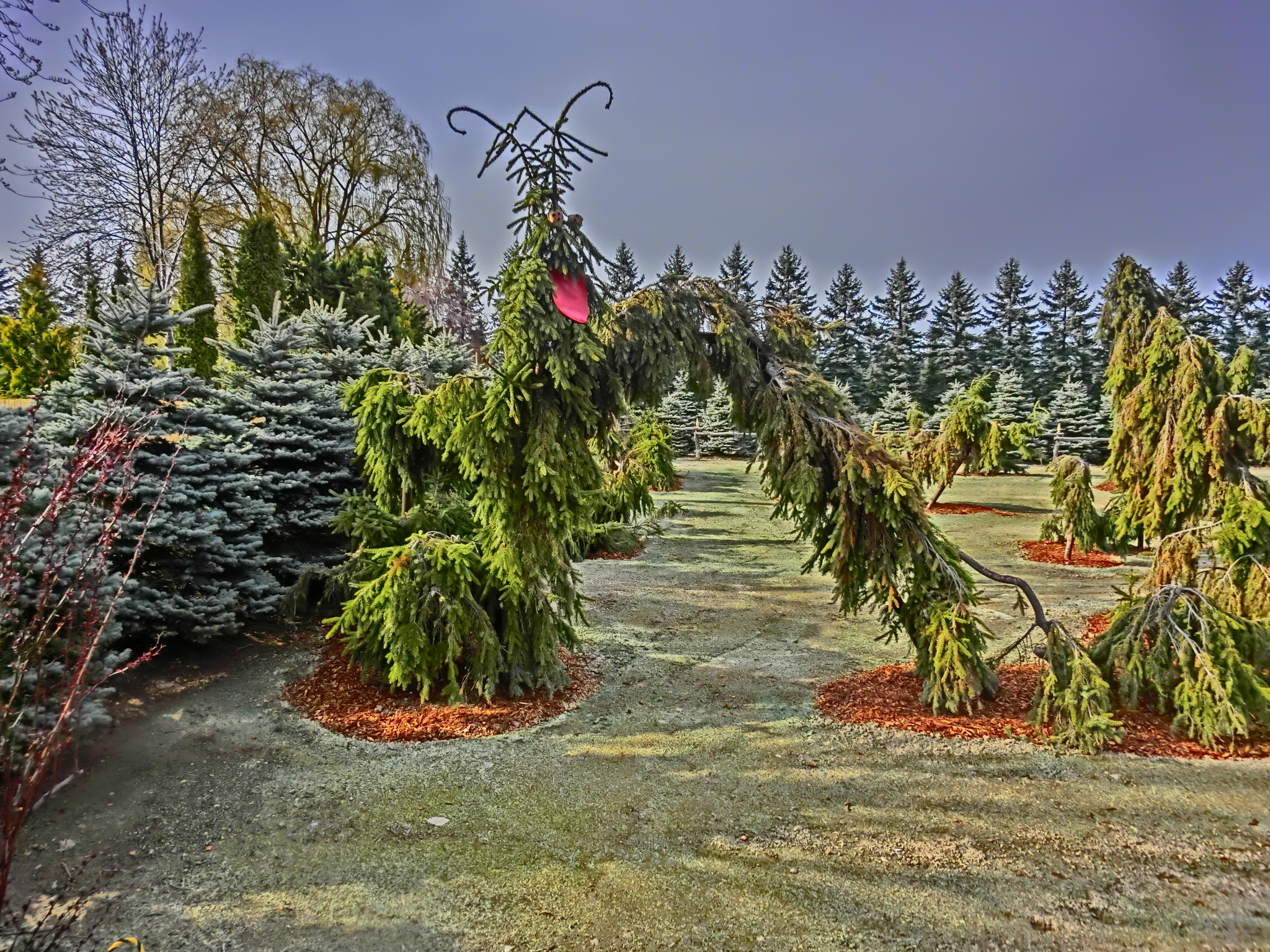
Cultivar 'Pendula'

== Cultivation and uses ==
Outside its native range, Serbian spruce is of major importance as an ornamental tree in large gardens, valued in northern Europe and North America for its very attractive crown form and ability to grow on a wide range of soils, including alkaline, clay, acid and sandy soil, although it prefers moist, drained loam. The crown shape is heritable, with high altitude seed sources retaining the narrow crown in cultivation, and lower altitude sources their broader crown.

It is also grown to a small extent in forestry for Christmas trees, timber and paper production, particularly in northern Europe, though its slow growth makes it less important than Sitka spruce or Norway spruce. In cultivation, it has produced hybrids with the closely related black spruce (named as P. × mariorika), and also with Sitka spruce.

=== AGM cultivars ===
The following cultivars have gained the Royal Horticultural Society's Award of Garden Merit:

- Picea omorika 'Nana' – a dwarf form
- Picea omorika 'Pendula' – a weeping form
