= Mitrinović =

Mitrinović is a Serbian surname. Notable people with the surname include:

- Dimitrije Mitrinović (1887–1953), Serbian philosopher, poet, revolutionary, mystic, theoretician of modern painting, traveller and cosmopolite.
- Dragoslav Mitrinović (1908–1995), Serbian mathematician

== See also ==
- Mitrović, a surname
