= Mkhitar =

- Pronunciation: [məχiˈtʰɑɾ]
- Gender: Male

Origin
- Origin: Armenian
- Meaning: "consolation, solace"
- Region of origin: Armenia

Mkhitar or Mekhitar or Mechitar or Latinized Mechitarius (Armenian: Մխիթար) is an Armenian male given name. See Մխիթար for more on the origin of the name.

The surname Mkhitaryan is from this name.

Notable people bearing this name include:

== Historical ==
- Mekhitar of Sebaste (1676–1749), founder of the Mekhitarists
- Mkhitar of Ani (12th–13th centuries), Armenian historian and priest
- Mekhitar of Ayrivank (1222–1307), compiler of a canon of holy books, composer officer.
- Mkhitar Gosh (1130–1213), a scholar, writer, public figure, thinker, and priest.
- Mkhitar Sparapet (?-1730), a military commander
- Mkhitar Heratsi, an Armenian physician of the 12th century

== Contemporary ==
- Mkhitar Hayrapetyan, Armenian politician
- Mkhitar Djrbashian (1918–1994), a notable Armenian mathematician.
- Mkhitar Manukyan (born 1973), an Armenian wrestler
- Mkhitar Mnatsakanyan (born 1950), Armenian politician and minister
