= Zaovine =

Zaovine Заовине
- Village (Selo)
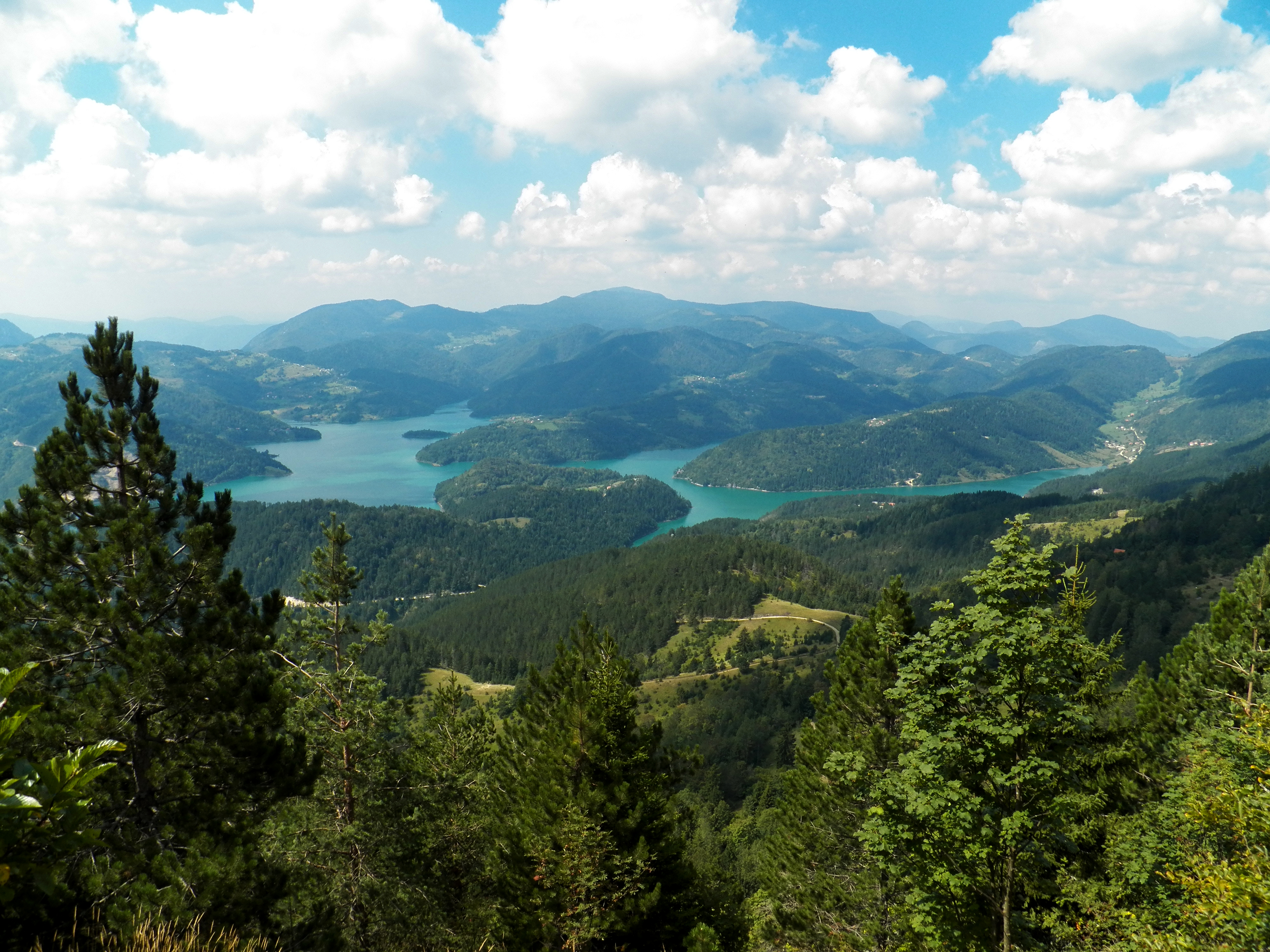
- Aerial view of Zaovine Lake

- Location within Serbia
- Coordinates: 43°51′49″N 19°23′16″E
- Country: Serbia
- District: Zlatibor District
- Municipality: Bajina Bašta

Area
  - Total: 63.99 km^{2} (24.71 sq mi)
- Elevation: 991 m (3,251 ft)

Population (2011)
  - Total: 263
  - Density: 4.11/km^{2} (10.6/sq mi)
- Time zone: UTC+1 (CET)
  - Summer (DST): UTC+2 (CEST)
- Postal code: 31251
- Area code: +381(0)31
- Car plates: BB

Zaovine (Serbian Cyrillic: Заовине) is a village located in the municipality of Bajina Bašta, Serbia. According to the 2022 census, the village has a population of 169 people. In 2011, it had a population of 263 inhabitants. The whole territory of the village is a part of the Tara National park and is in close proximity of the Zaovine Lake, an artificial reservoir created on the Beli Rzav river for the Bajina Bašta II reversible hydro power plant.

== Gallery ==
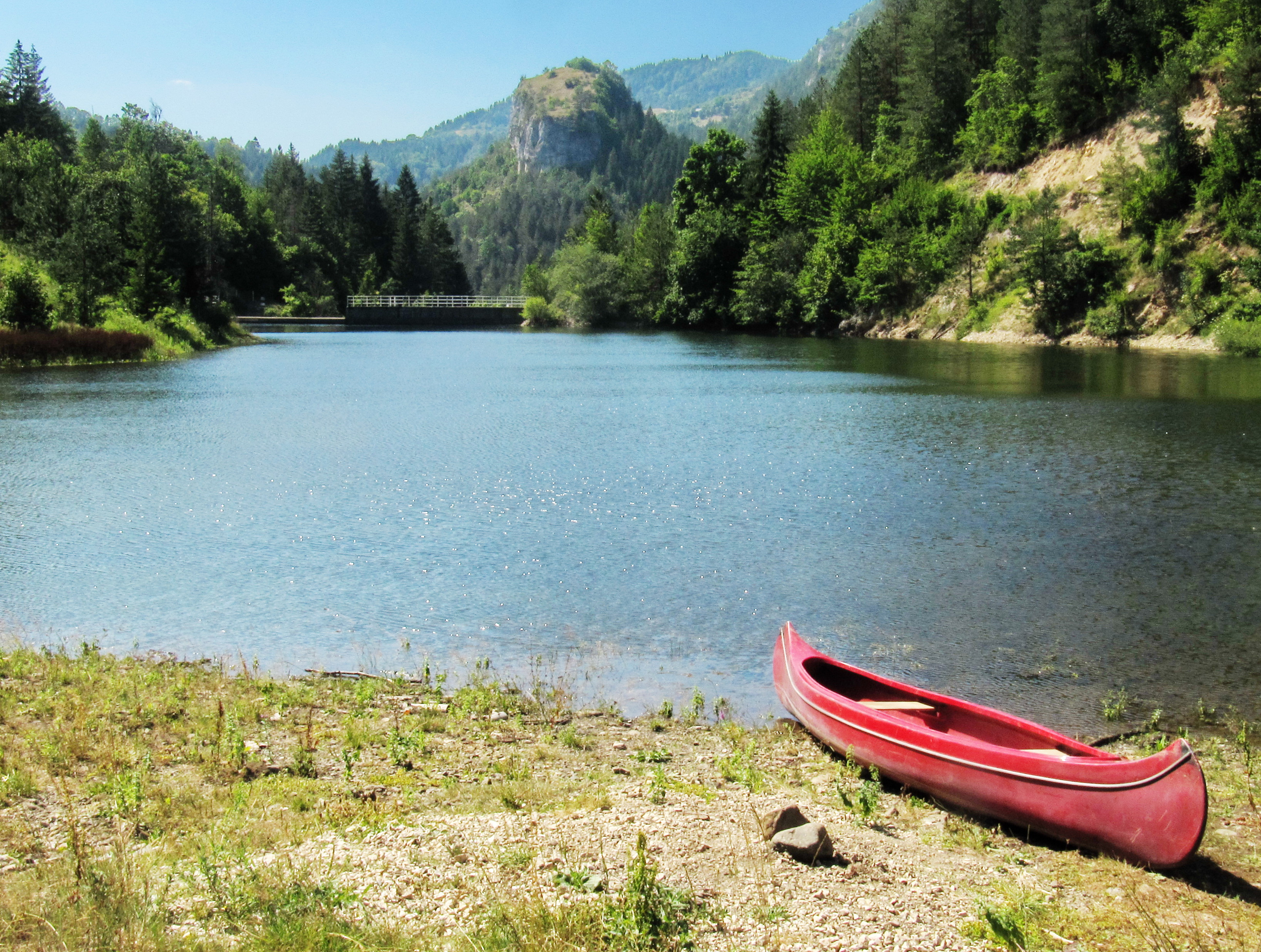
Zaovine Lake

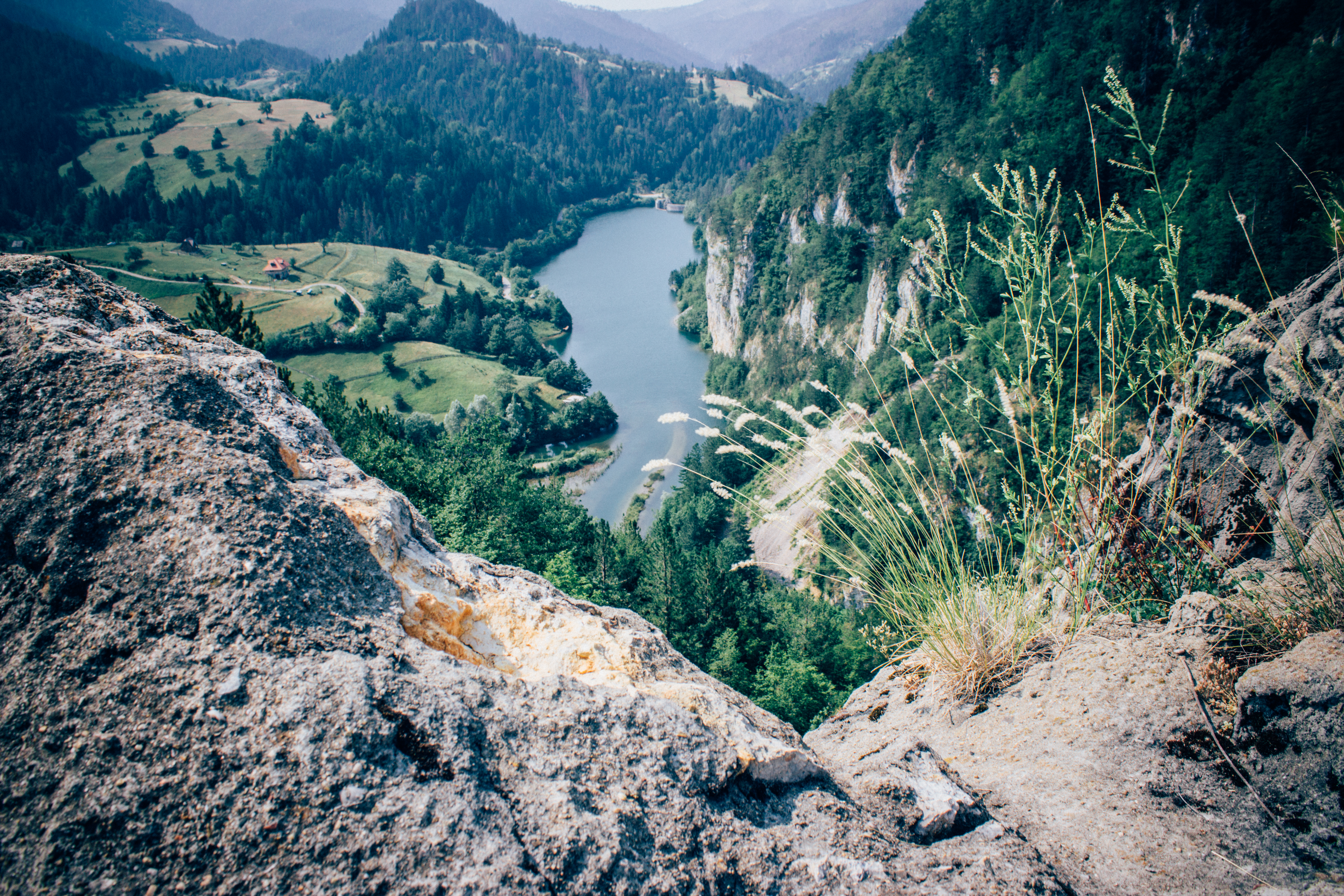
View of Zaovine Lake from the top of a nearby hill

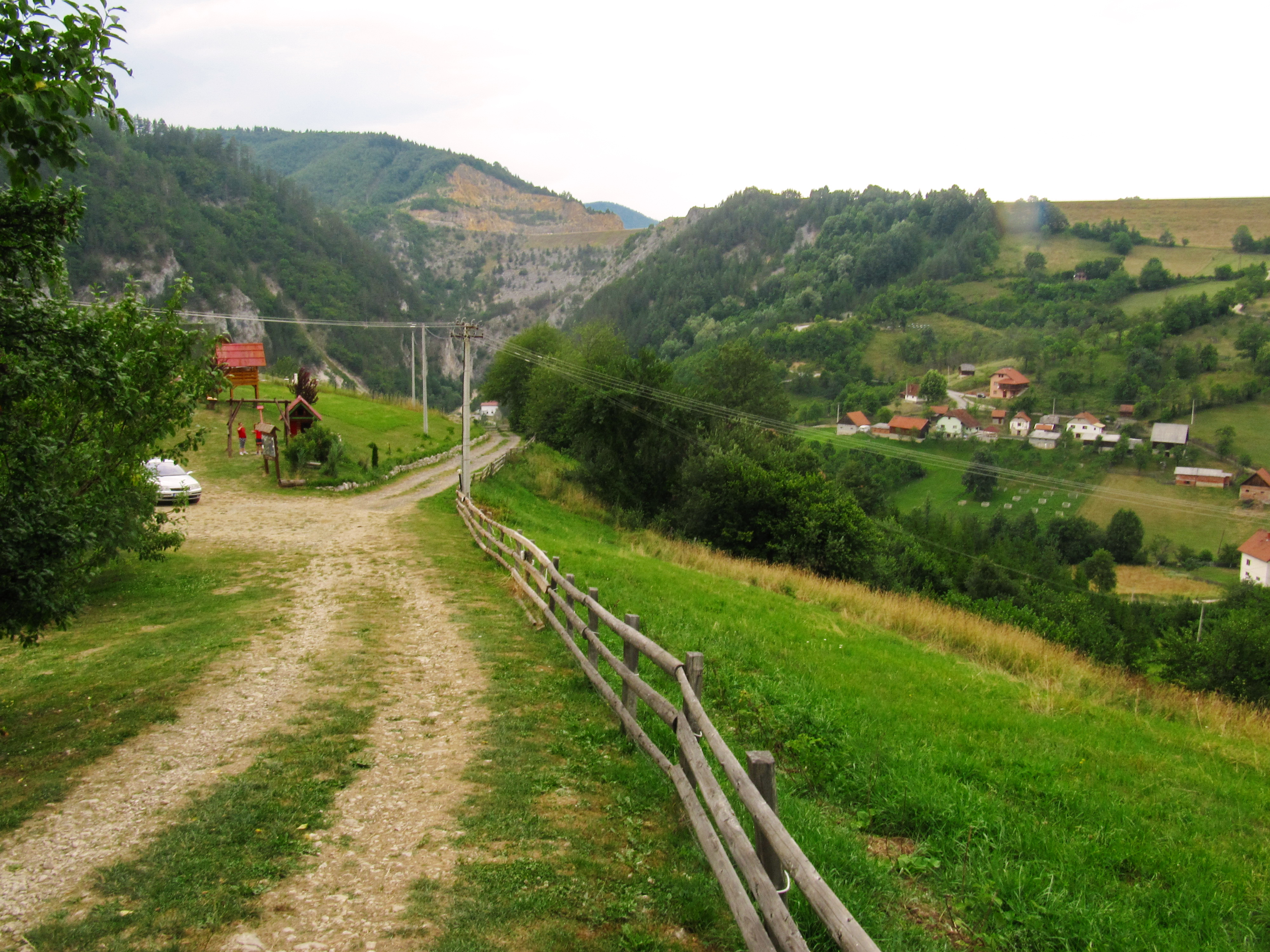
Zaovine village landscape

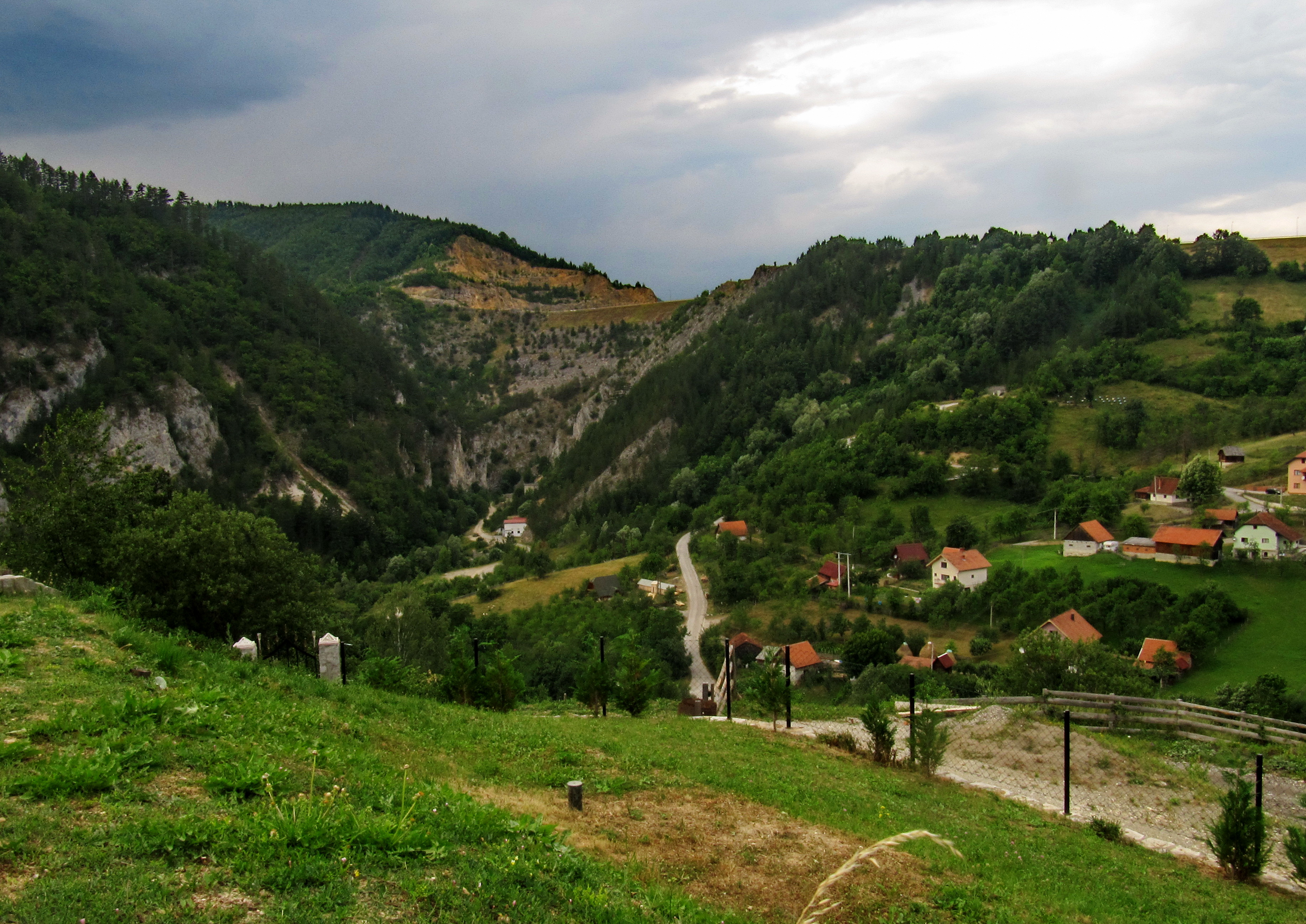
Zaovine village landscape

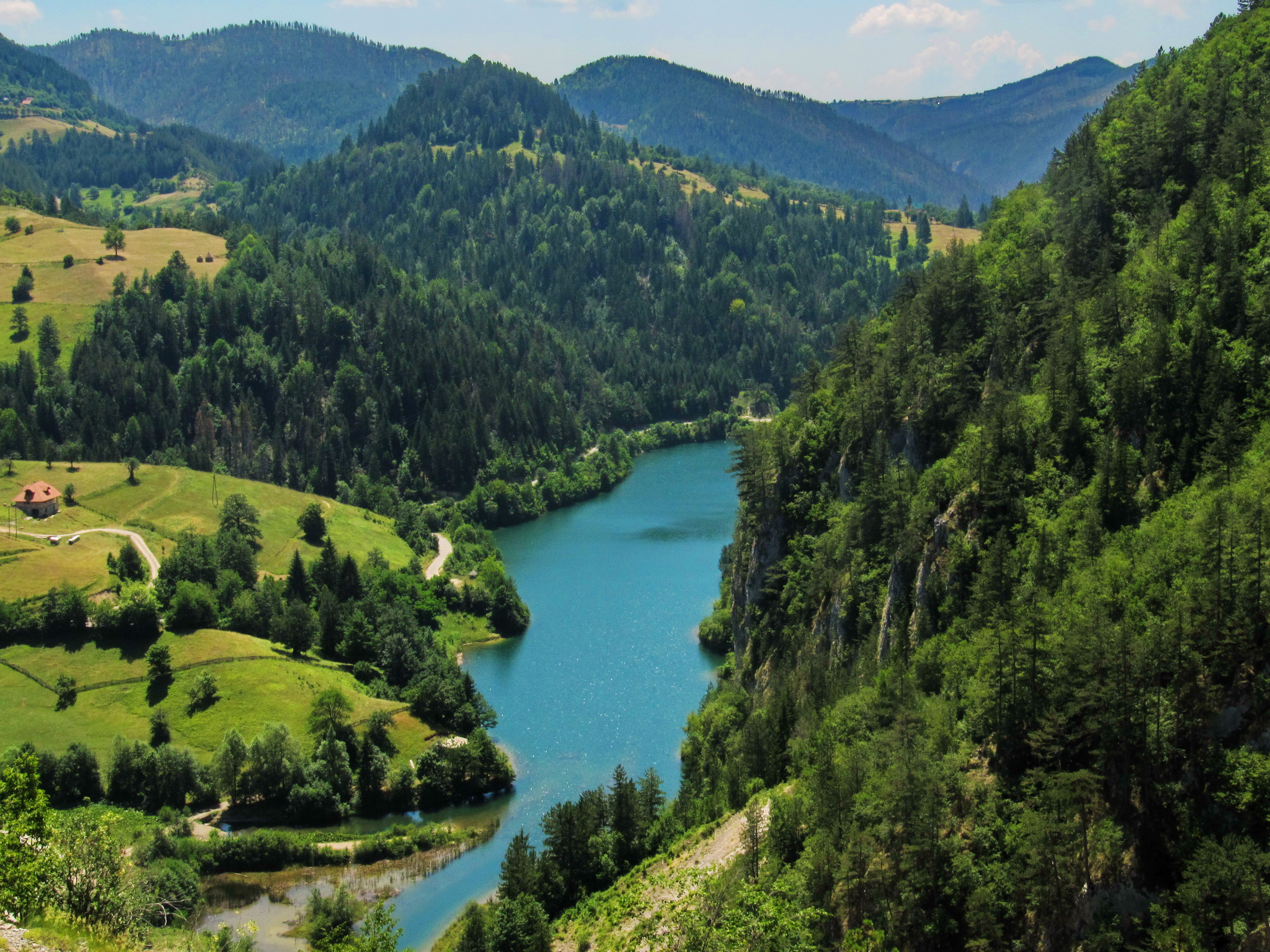
View of Zaovine lake from nearby hill

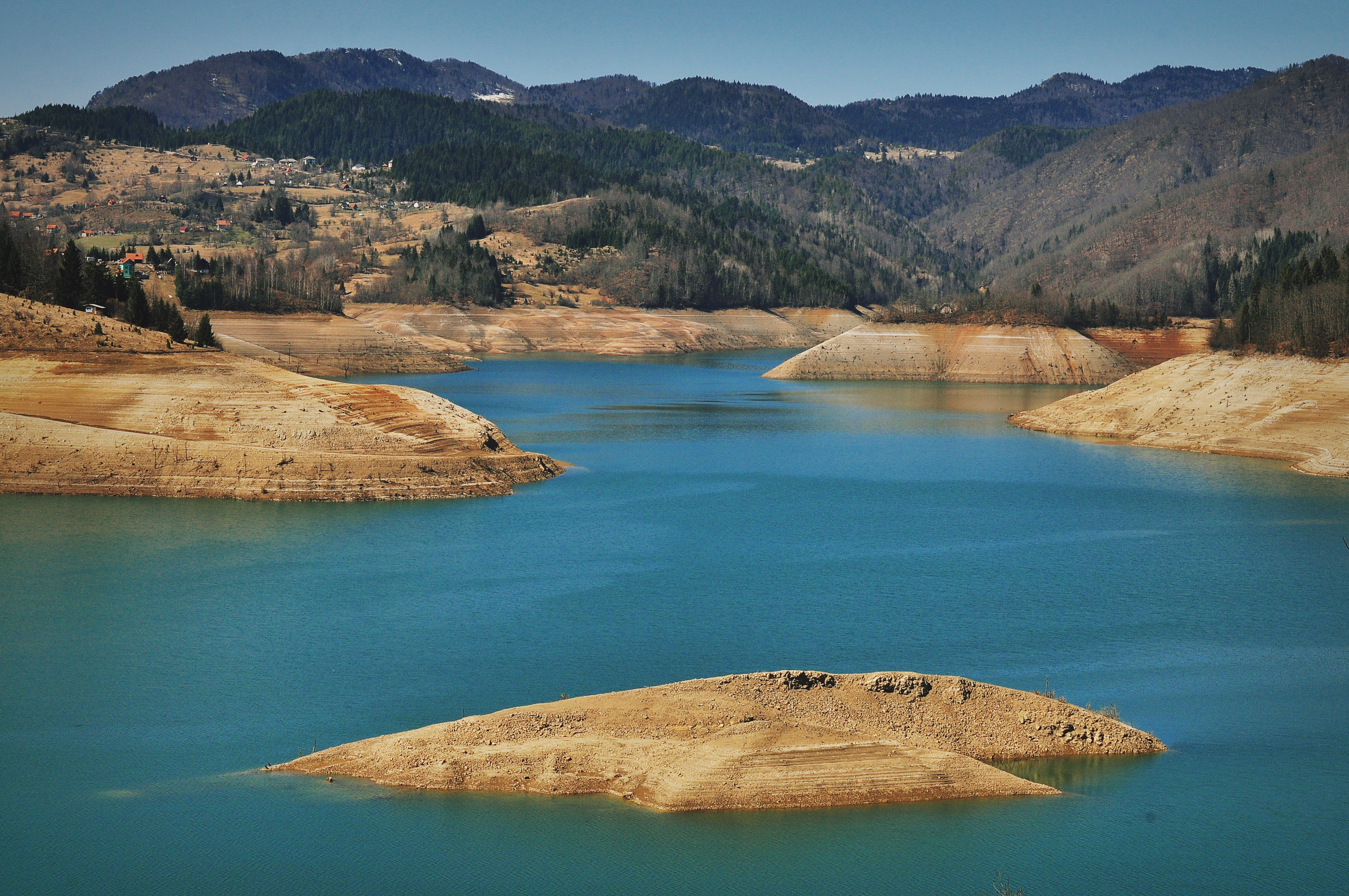
Zaovine Lake in early spring
