= Mitrovica =

Mitrovica, which stems from the name "Saint Demetrius" or "Sveti Dimitrije" (Cyrillic: "Свети Димитрије") may refer to:

== Places ==
- District of Mitrovica, a district in Kosovo
  - Mitrovica, Kosovo, a city in the district above
    - North Mitrovica, the northern part of the city above
- Sremska Mitrovica, a city and municipality in Srem, Vojvodina, Serbia
  - Sremska Mitrovica prison
  - Sremska Mitrovica Airport
  - Mačvanska Mitrovica, a town in the municipality above

== People with the surname ==
- Rexhep Mitrovica (1888–1967), Albanian politician
- Jerry X. Mitrovica (1960-), geoscientist

== See also ==
- Kosovska Mitrovica District (Serbia), a district of Serbia in Kosovo between 1990 and 1999
- Mitrović
- Mitrovice (disambiguation)
