= Nenad Mitrović (footballer, born 1980) =

Serbian footballer

Personal information
- Full name: Nenad Mitrović
- Date of birth: 21 October 1980 (age 46)
- Place of birth: Leskovac, SFR Yugoslavia
- Height: 1.78 m (5 ft 10 in)
- Position: Forward

Senior career*
Years	Team	Apps	(Gls)
2001–2002	Dubočica	31	(15)
2002–2003	Zemun	12	(2)
2003–2004	Obilić	19	(3)
2005–2006	Voždovac	18	(1)
2006–2011	Dubočica		
2011	Radnički Pirot	14	(1)
2012	Dubočica	13	(4)
2013–2014	Moravac Mrštane	29	(8)
2014–2016	Radan Lebane	49	(8)
2016–2018	Jedinstvo Bošnjace	56	(10)
- * Club domestic league appearances and goals

Nenad Mitrović (Serbian Cyrillic: Ненад Митровић; born 21 October 1980) is a Serbian retired footballer who played as a forward.
