= Nemanja Mitrović =

Nemanja Mitrović may refer to:

- Nemanja Mitrović (basketball) (born 1990), Canadian-Bosnian basketball player
- Nemanja Mitrović (footballer) (born 1992), Slovenian footballer
