= Mitrovac (Bajina Bašta) =

- Village
- Location within Serbia
- Coordinates: 43°55′N 19°26′E
- Country: Serbia
- Time zone: UTC+1 (CET)
  - Summer (DST): UTC+2 (CEST)

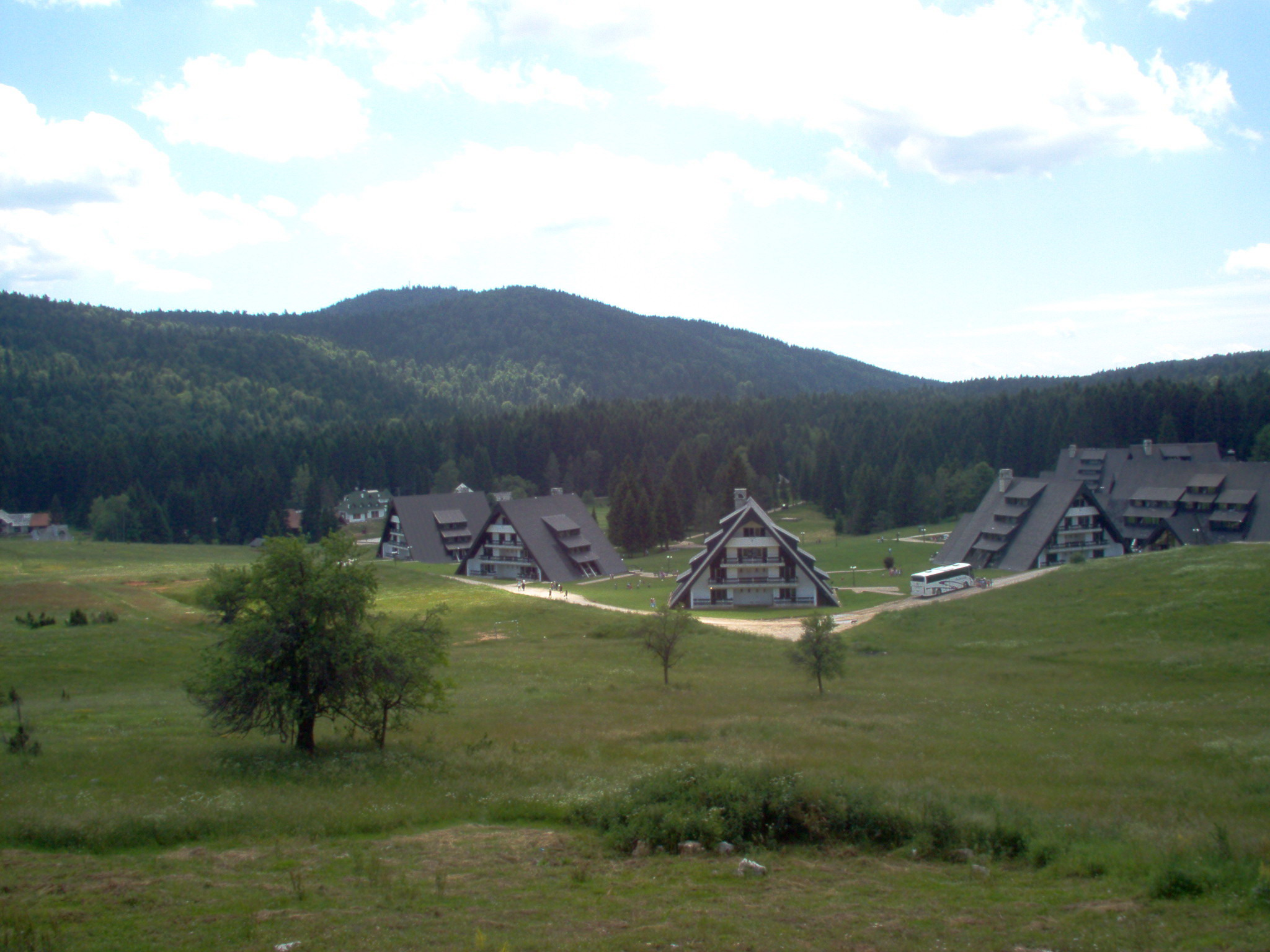
Structures in Mitrovac.

Mitrovac (Serbian Cyrillic: Митровац) is a village located on the Tara Mountain, in the Bajina Bašta municipality. The village has a recreation centre, and is home to several hotel facilities, especially for young students.

== See also ==
Mitrovac
