= Drina =

River in the Balkans

Drina Дрина
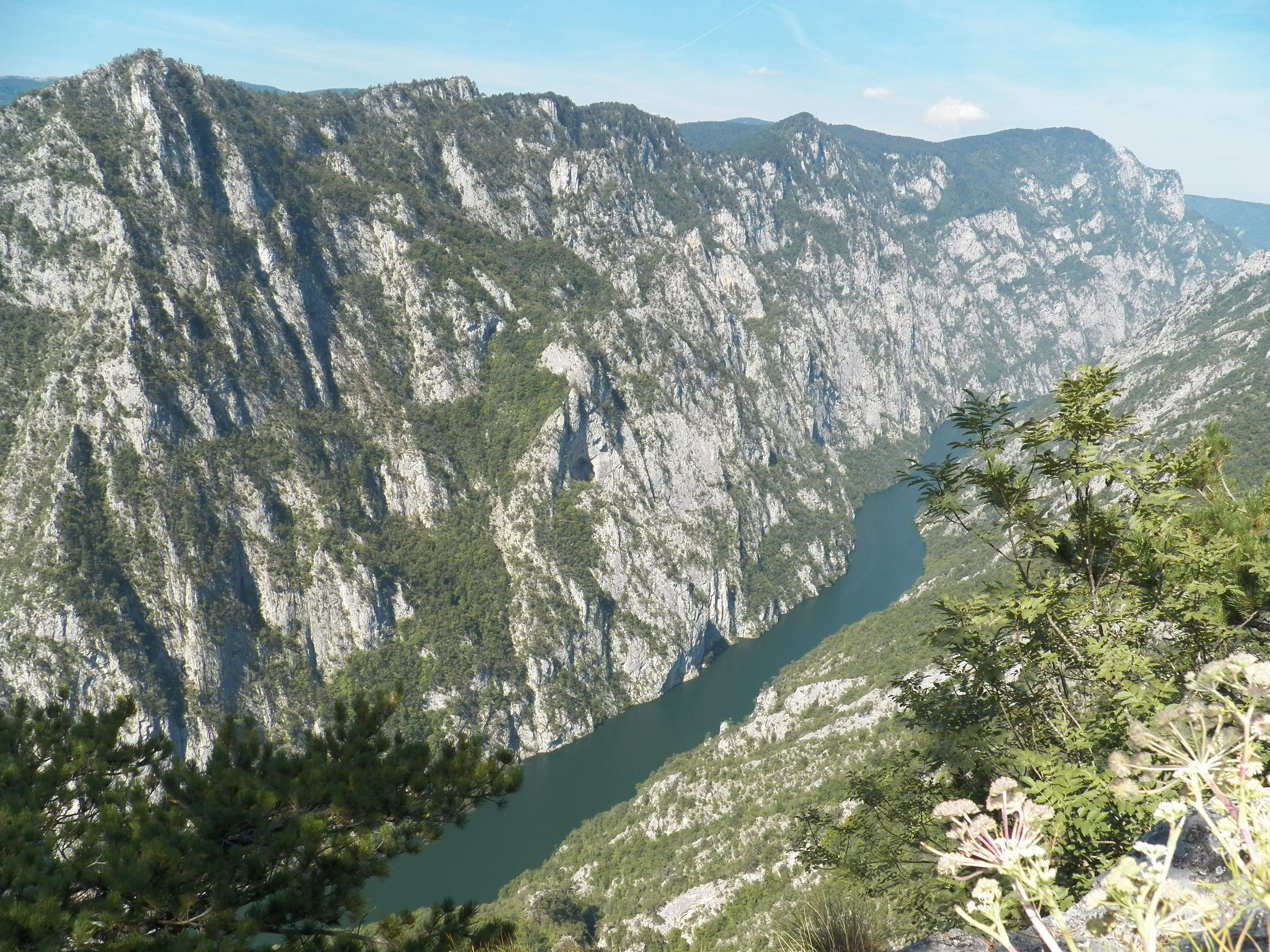
- The Drina River forms Perućac Lake, Bosnia and Herzegovina looking from mountain Tara in Serbia

Location
- Country: Bosnia and Herzegovina, Serbia

Physical characteristics
- Source
  - location: Bosnia and Herzegovina, between the slopes of Maglić, Pivska planina and Hum mountains (in the area of Šćepan Polje and Hum villages)
- Mouth
  - location: Sava, at the Serbian-Bosnian border between Crna Bara and Bosanska Rača
  - coordinates: 43°20′55″N 18°50′22″E
- Length: 346 km (215 mi)
- Basin size: 20,320 km^{2} (7,850 sq mi)
- Discharge
  - average: from 125 m^{3}/s (4,400 cu ft/s) at the Ćehotina's mouth to 370 m^{3}/s (13,000 cu ft/s) on the Drina's mouth into the Sava

Basin features
- Progression: Sava→ Danube→ Black Sea

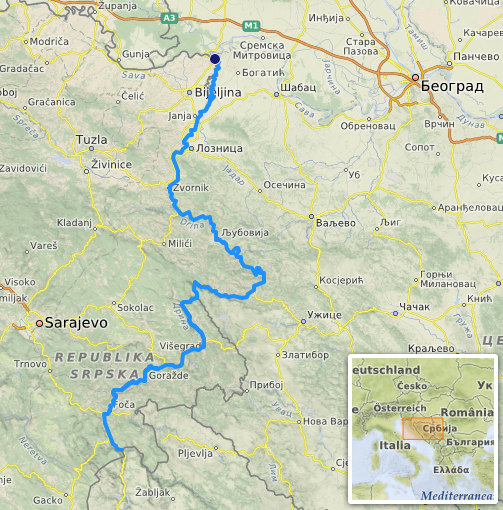
Map of the region between Bosnia, Montenegro and Serbia through which runs the Drina

The Drina (Serbian Cyrillic: Дрина, pronounced [drǐːna]) is a 346 km (215 mi) long river in the Balkans, which forms a large portion of the border between Bosnia and Herzegovina and Serbia. It is the longest tributary of the Sava River and the longest karst river in the Dinaric Alps which belongs to the Danube River drainage basin.

The Drina originates from the confluence of the rivers Tara and Piva, in the glen between the slopes of the Maglić, Hum and Pivska Planina mountains, between the villages of Šćepan Polje, Montenegro and Hum, Bosnia and Herzegovina.

== Etymology ==
Its name is derived from the Roman name of the river (Latin: Drinus) which in turn is derived from Greek (Ancient Greek: Dreinos) which is derived from the native name of Illyrian origin.

== Hydrological characteristics ==
The Drina is a very fast and cold alpine river, with a very high 175:346 meandering ratio, and relatively clean water, which has particularly intensive green coloration, a usual characteristic of most alpine rivers running through a karstic and flysch terrain made of limestone, underlying the area in which the river carved its bed.

Its average depth is 3 to 5 m (9.8 to 16.4 ft), the deepest being 12 m (39 ft) at Tijesno. On average, the Drina is 50–60 m (160–200 ft) wide, but it ranges from only 12–20 m (39–66 ft) at Tijesno to up to 200 m (660 ft) at Bajina Bašta and Ljubovija. The drainage basin covers 19,570 square km (4.8 million acres), branching into Bosnia and Herzegovina, Serbia, Montenegro, and Albania. The Drina belongs to the Black Sea drainage basin. Before it was regulated by several power stations, the Drina used to flood its valley. The most disastrous flood occurred in 1896, which destroyed the town of Ljubovija.

=== Origin ===
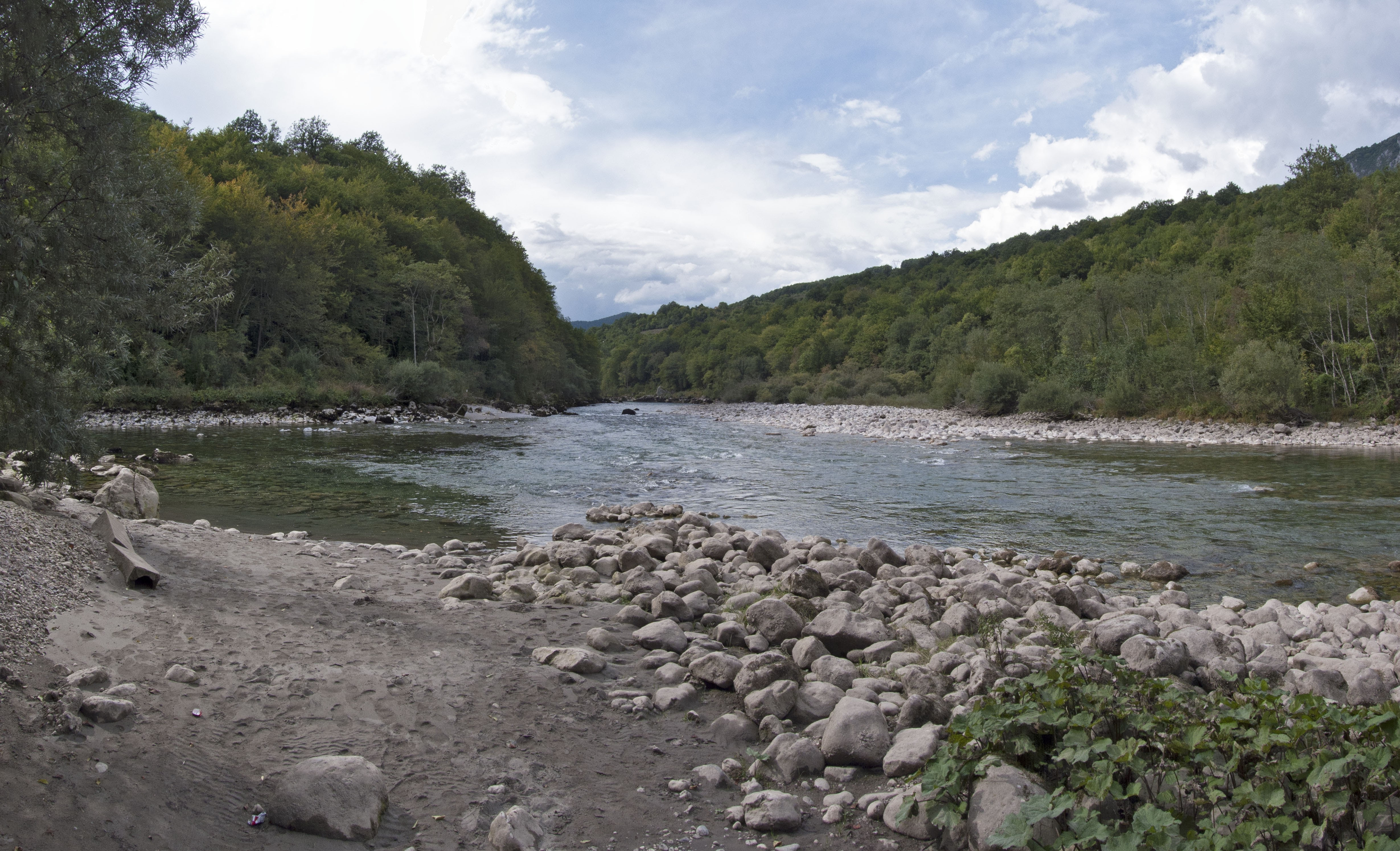
The source of Drina, looking downstream: the Tara entering the frame from the right, the Piva from the left, creating the Drina, in the middle of the frame and starts its flow towards a top of the image.

The Drina originates at the point of confluence of the rivers Tara and Piva, between the slopes of the Maglić, Hum and Pivska Planina mountains, and the villages of Šćepan Polje (in Montenegro) and Hum (Bosnia and Herzegovina). At its origin, it flows west, then makes a long curve to the northeast, around the Maluša Mountain. From here it is northbound, in terms of general direction, for the rest of its journey toward the Sava. Here, in its headwaters, the Drina receives the Sutjeska River from the left.

=== Length ===
The Drina is formed by the confluence of the Tara and the Piva rivers, both of which flow from Montenegro and converge on the border of Bosnia and Herzegovina, at Hum and Šćepan Polje villages. The total length of the Tara river is 144 km (89 mi), of which 104 km (65 mi) are in Montenegro, while the final 40 km (25 mi) are in Bosnia and Herzegovina along which form the border between the two countries in several places. The Drina flows through Bosnia and Herzegovina northward for 346 km (215 mi), of which 206 km (128 mi) is along the border of Bosnia and Herzegovina and Serbia, and finally spills out into the Sava river near Bosanska Rača village in northeastern Bosnia and Herzegovina. Measured from the source of the Tara, its longer headwater, the Drina is 487 kilometers (303 miles) long.

=== Tributaries ===
Major left tributaries: Sutjeska (at Kosman), Bjelava (at Trbušće), Bistrica (at Brod na Drini), Kolunska rijeka (at Ustikolina), Osanica (at Osanica), Prača (at Ustiprača), Žepa (Žepa), Drinjača (at Drinjača), Kamenica (at Đevanje), Sapna (at Karakaj) and Janja (at Janja).

Major right tributaries: Ćehotina (at Foča), Janjina (at Samobor), Lim (the longest one, 220 km, at Brodar), Rzav (at Višegrad), Kukal (at Đurevići), Rogačica (at Rogačica), Trešnjica (south of Ljubovija), Ljuboviđa (at Ljubovija), Jadar (at Straža) and Lešnica (at Lešnica).

=== Navigation ===
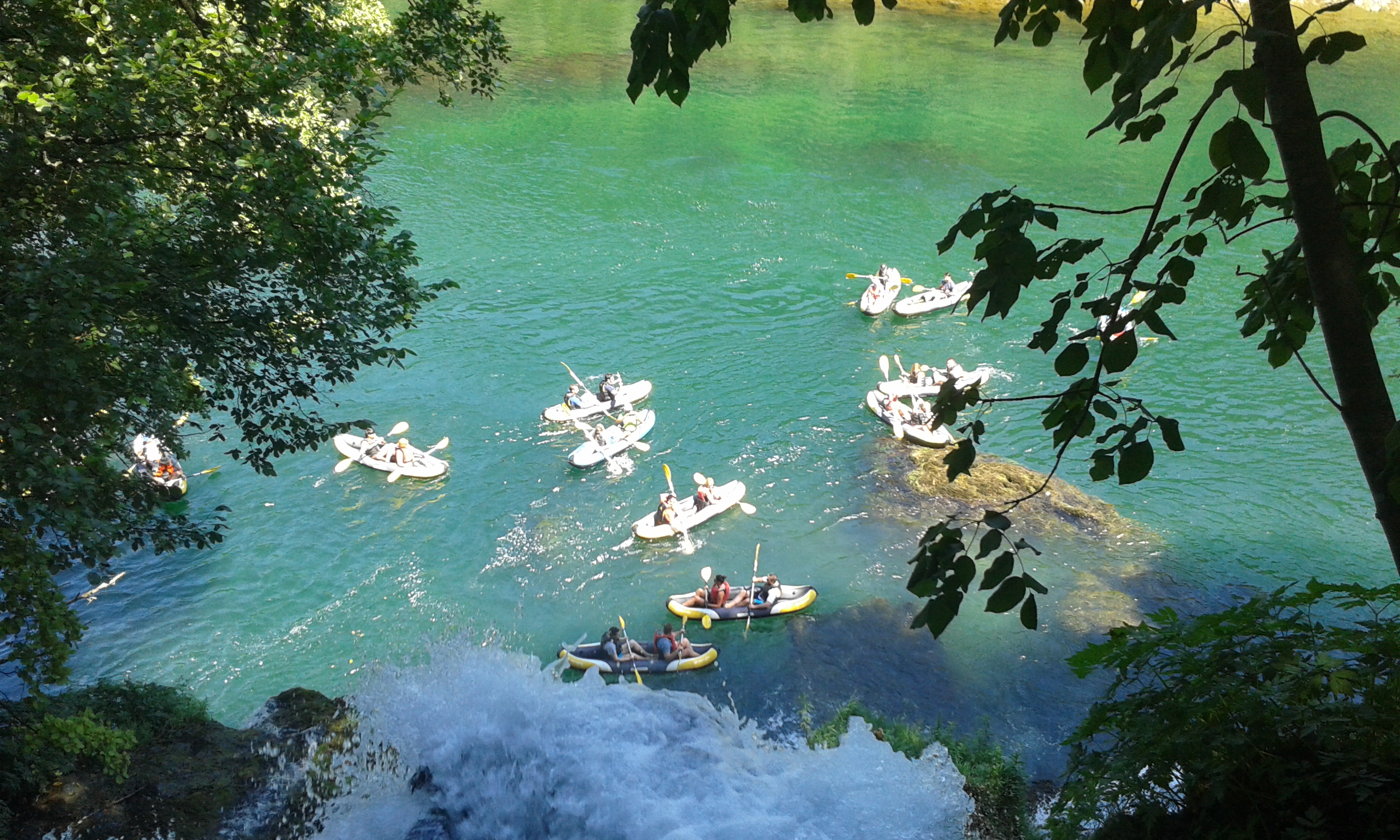
Kayaking on the Drina.

The river is no longer navigable, but along with the Tara it represents the main kayaking and rafting attraction in Bosnia and Herzegovina and Montenegro. However, during history, small boat traffic on the Drina was quite developed. The earliest written sources of the Drina boats date from the early 17th century. Traversing through this area in the second half of the 17th century, Ottoman traveller Evliya Çelebi noted that people in the Drina valley cut 40 m (130 ft) tall oak trees and used their trunks to make boats, by hollowing them with primitive tools and controlled fire. This type of boat is called monoxyl or dugout canoe. He wrote that there were thousands of such boats at Zvornik, which navigated all the way to Belgrade, downstream the Drina and the Sava. Upstream from Zvornik, the boats did not navigate. Also, Foča has been the cradle of rafting, which was a peculiar side-effect of the development of industrial forestry and increased forest exploitation in the 19th century. Local loggers are known to have transported downed trees downstream, from as far upstream as the Upper Tara river around Mojkovac in Montenegro, all the way downstream to the mills in Foča, by creating rafts from a number of trunks and riding them navigating rapids and whitewater along the Tara canyon and Drina. rafts from explanation of local forests in Montenegro and Bosnia and Herzegovina since ancient times, known in the second half of the 19th century, when logs of felled forest, exploited by the Austro-Hungarians, were lowered along the Tara and Drina, all the way to the sawmill in Foča.

== Geographical characteristic ==
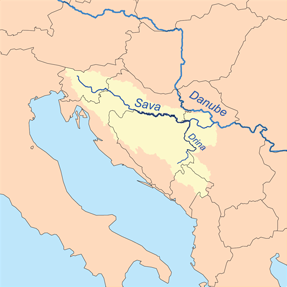
Map showing the Drina within the Sava River watershed.

=== Major settlements ===
On its path northward to the Semberija region on the Bosnian side, and Mačva on the Serbian, both part of a wider area of Posavina, where it meets with the Sava, the Drina river passes through Podrinje and number of settlements situated within the region: Foča, Ustikolina, Goražde, Ustiprača, Međeđa, Višegrad, Perućac, Bratunac, Ljubovija, Zvornik and Mali Zvornik, Loznica.

=== Border river ===
The Drina flows between the mountains of Zvijezda and Sušica and it is flooded by the artificial Lake Perućac on the northern slopes of the Tara mountain, created by the Bajina Bašta power plant. The villages of Prohići and Osatica (in Bosnia and Herzegovina) are located on the lake, as well as the ruins of the medieval town of Đurđevac. The river is dammed at the village of Perućac, where a strong well springs out from the Tara mountain, flowing into the Drina as a waterfall. In addition, the waters of Drina are used for several fish ponds for the rainbow trout spawning.

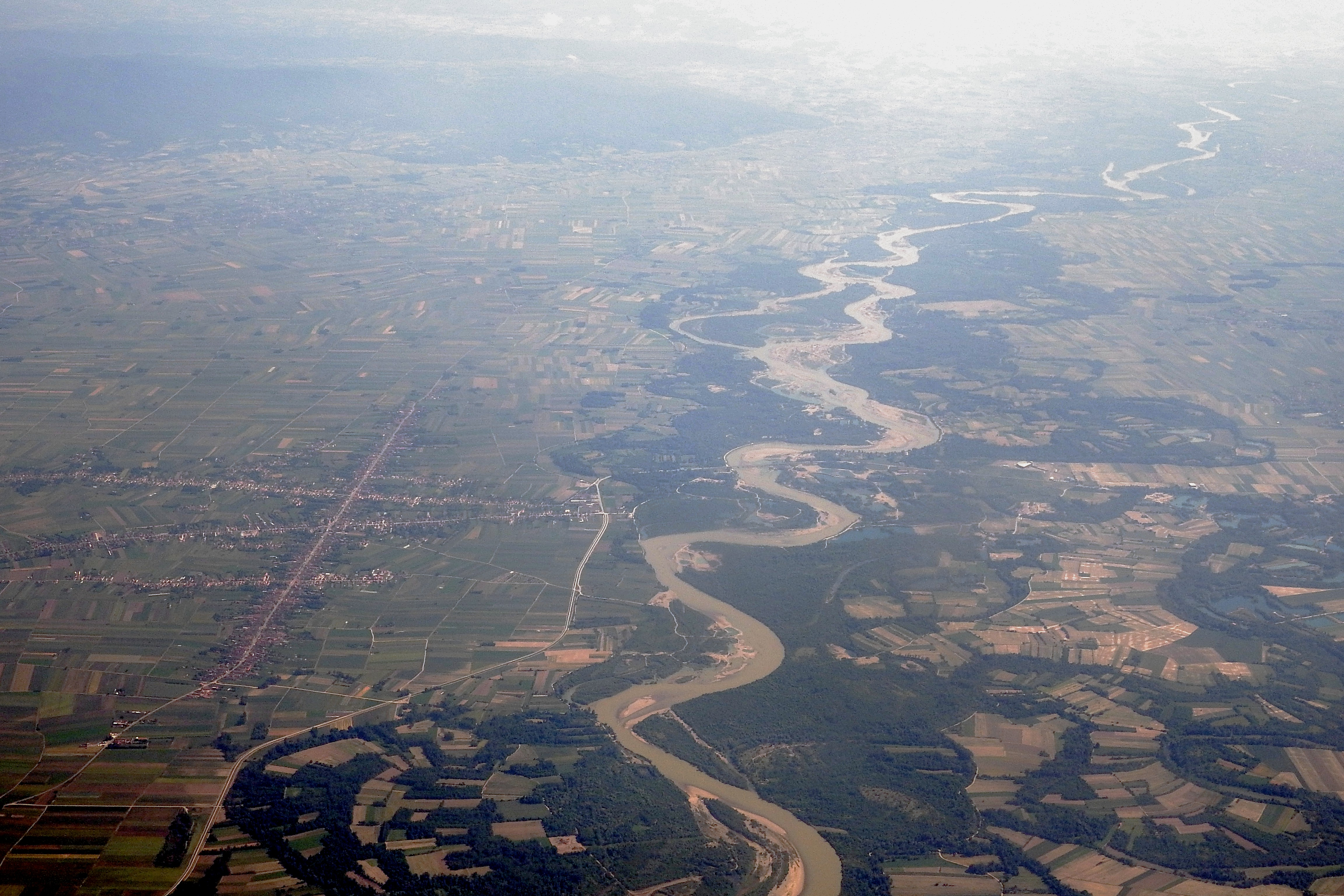
Drina river as the boundary between Serbia (left) and Bosnia and Herzegovina (right)

The river continues to the villages of Peći, Dobrak, Skelani (in Bosnia and Herzegovina) and Zaugline (in Serbia), reaching the town of Bajina Bašta. At the villages of Donja Crvica and Rogačica, the Drina makes a large turn, completely changing its direction from the northeast to the northwest. This distinct geographical feature forms the Osat and Ludmer regions of Bosnia and Herzegovina, which are separated by the river from the Azbukovica part of the Podrinje region of Serbia.

=== Course ===
==== Upper Drina ====
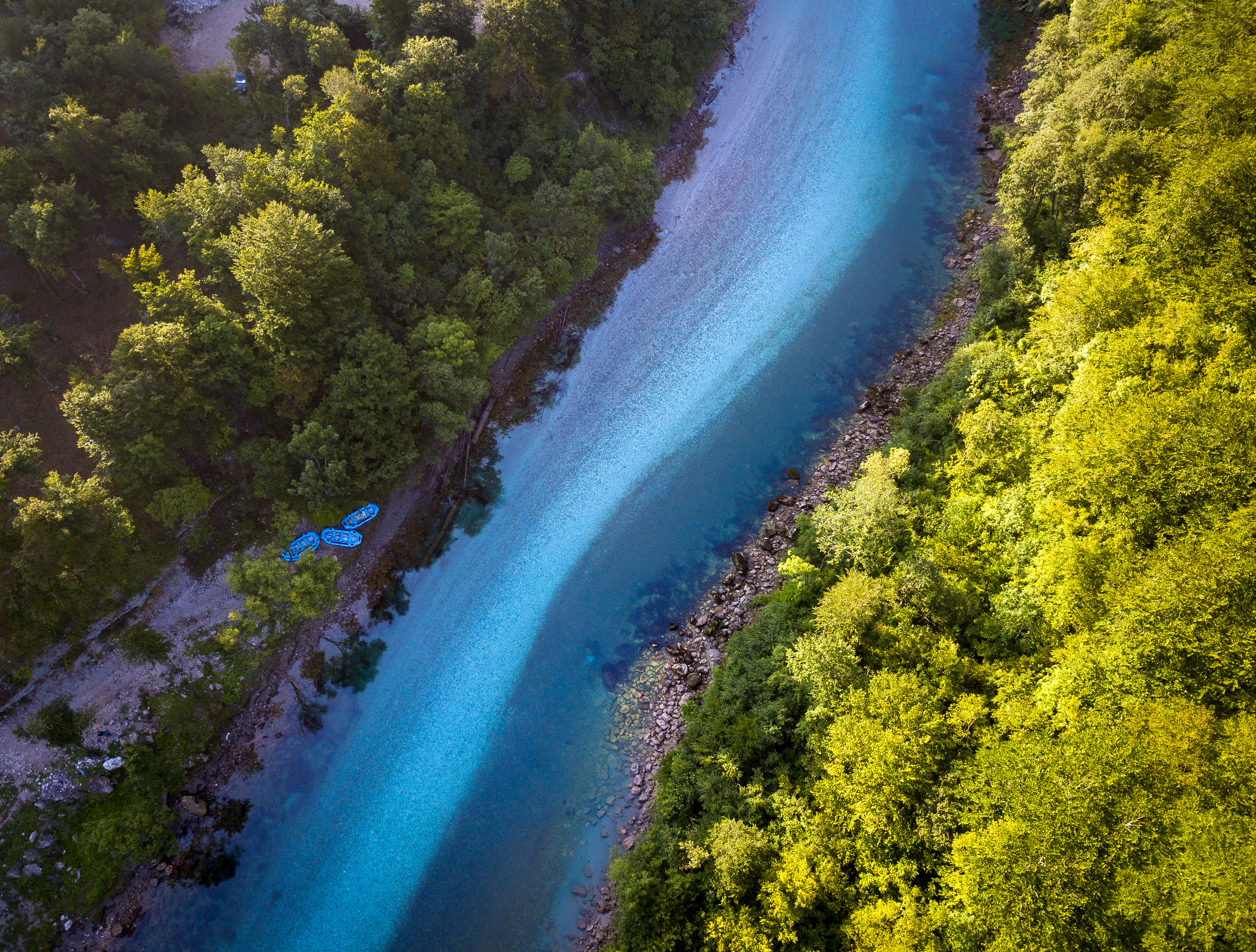
Upper Drina canyon near confluence with the Sutjeska.

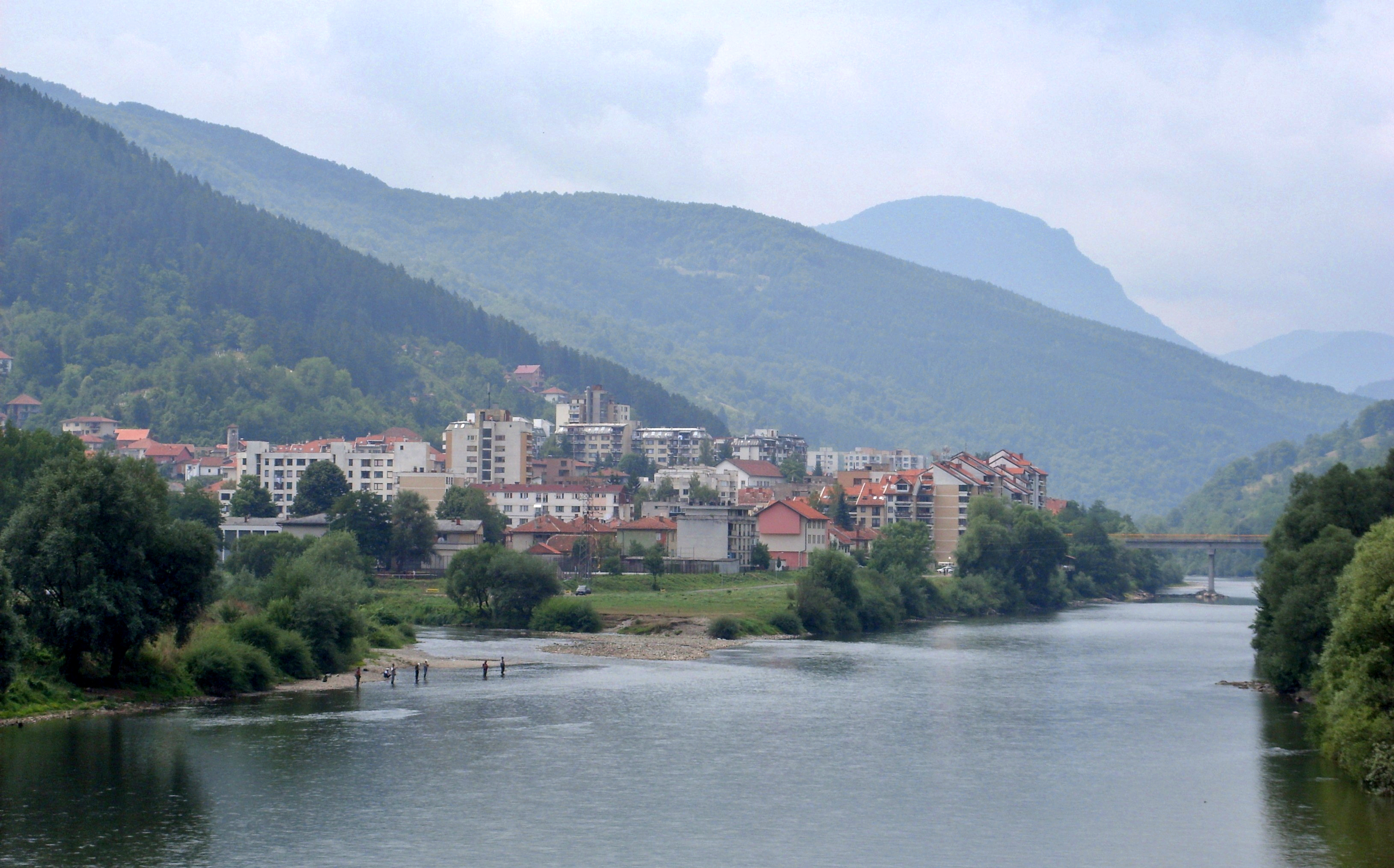
Foča with the Drina-Ćehotina confluence, Upper Drina, Bosnia and Herzegovina.

From its point of origin, at Šćepan Polje (in Montenegro) and Hum (Bosnia and Herzegovina), the Drina, after initial a couple of hundred meters of running westward around the Maluša mountain, starts its northward general direction flow for the rest of its journey toward the Sava. Here it flows through the villages of Kosman, Prijedjel, Dučeli, Čelikovo Polje, Kopilovi, Trbušće, Brod na Drini, until it reach a town of Foča. In this section the Drina receiving waters of the rivers of Sutjeska, Bjelava and Bistrica, from the left, while in Foča it gets replenished with a significant amount of waters from the Ćehotina, which flows from the right.

Downstream from Foča, the Drina enters a wide valley, the 45 km (28 mi)-long Suhi Dol-Biserovina area between the southernmost slopes of the Jahorina mountains from the north and the Kovač mountains from the south. The villages of Zlatari, Jošanica, Ustikolina, Cvilin, Zebina Šuma, Osanica, Kolovarice, Vranići, Mravinjac, Biljin, Vitkovići and Zupčići are located in the valley, as well as the town of Goražde. The river receives the Kolunska Rijeka and the Osanica as tributaries from the left.

The Drina continues in the northern general direction, flowing close to the villages of Žuželo, Odžak, Kopači and Ustiprača, entering the 26 km (16 mi) long Međeđa gorge, carved between the Vučevica mountains from the south and the southern slopes of the Devetak mountains from the north. The narrowest part of the Međeđa gorge is Tijesno, the 8 km (5.0 mi)-long section of the gorge where the river is at its narrowest (only 12 m (39 ft) wide), but also at its deepest (12 m). In this section, it receives the Prača river from the left, and the Janjina and Lim rivers from the right. The villages of Trbosilje, Međeđa and Orahovci are located in the gorge, which is for the most part flooded by the artificial Višegrad lake, created by the Višegrad hydroelectric power plant.

==== Middle Drina ====
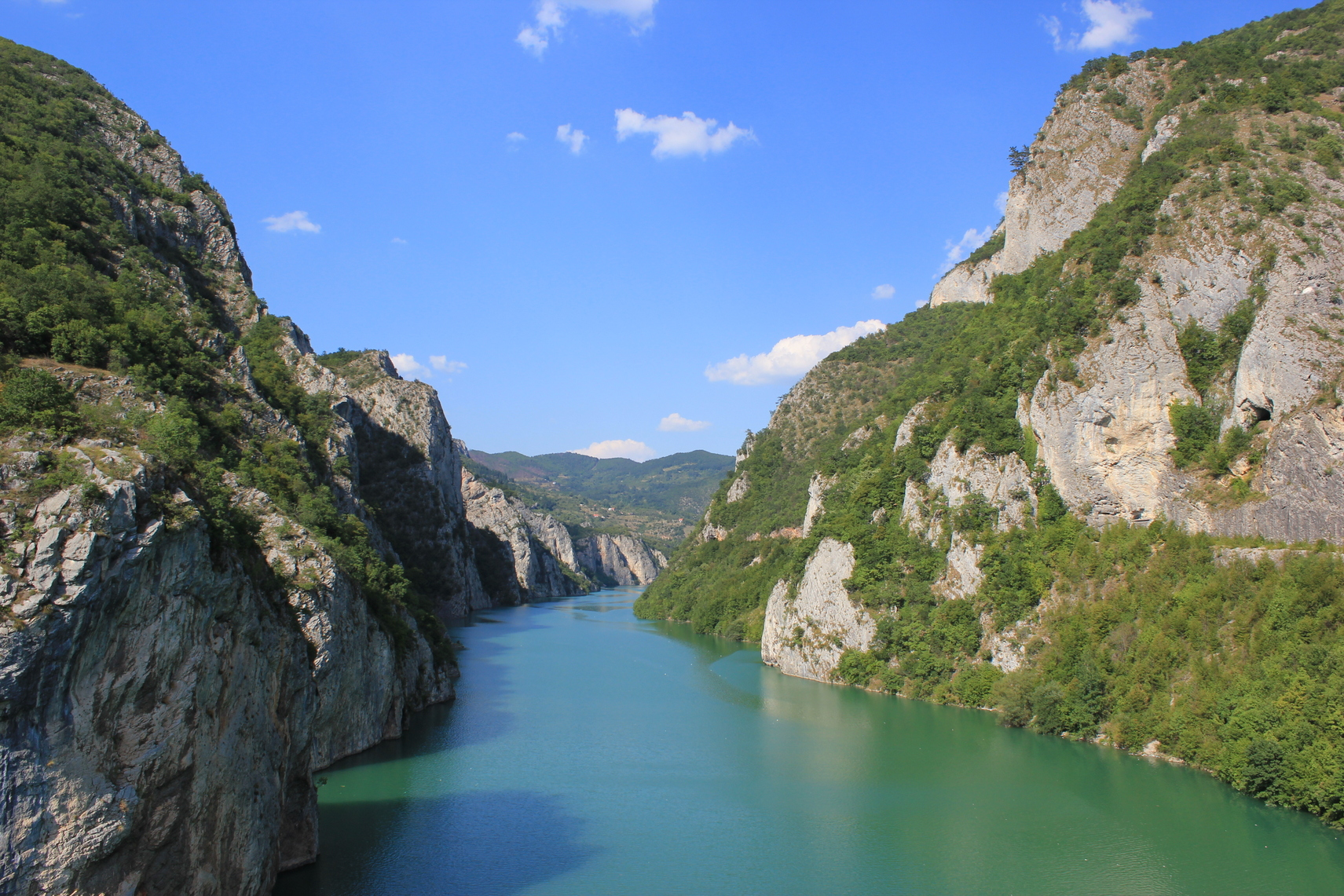
Drina Canyon flooded by Perućac lake.

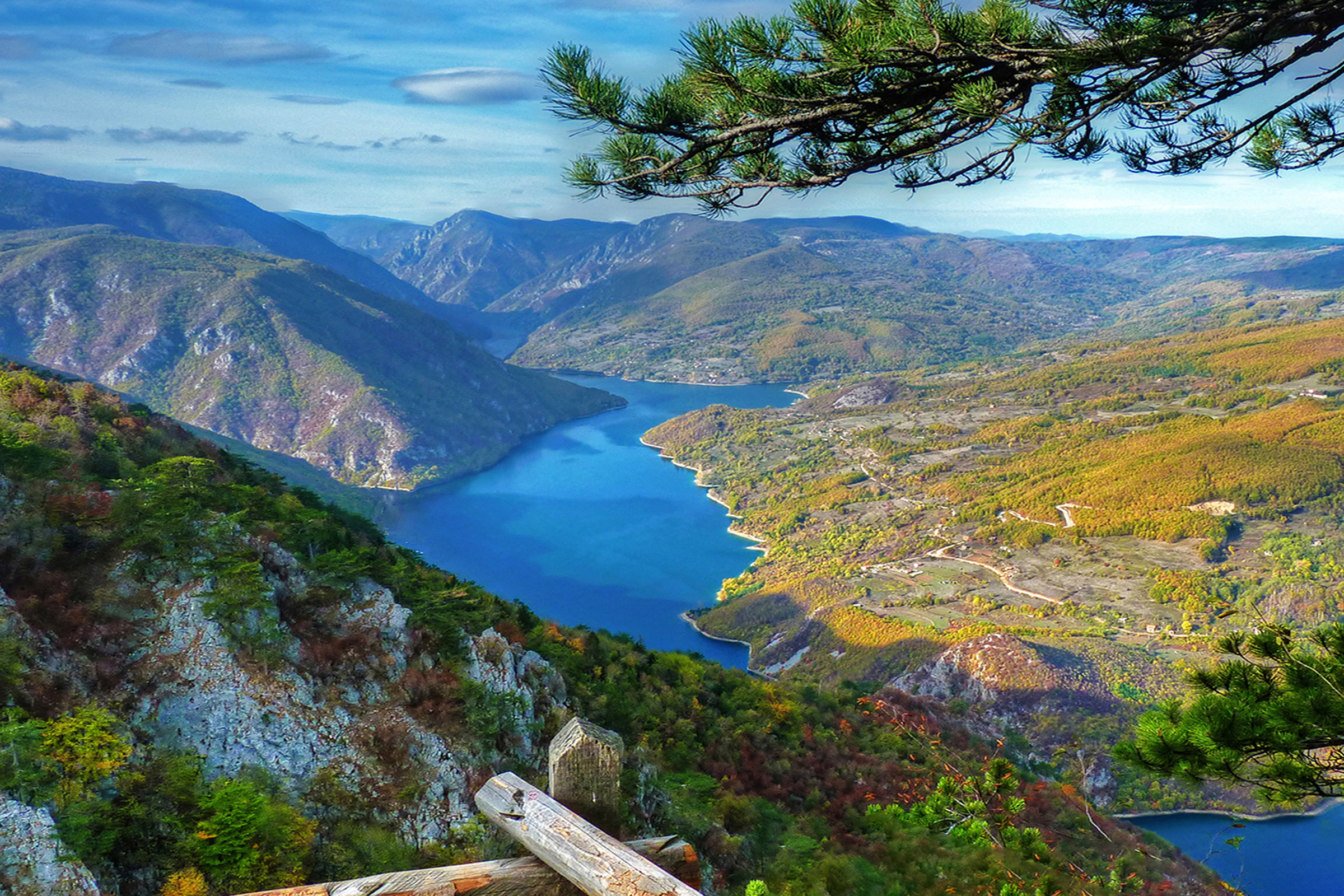
Drina's Perućac lake at Banjska.

At the town of Višegrad, the Drina receives the Rzav River from the right and turns northwest at the Suva Gora mountain into the Klotjevac gorge. The gorge is 38 km (24 mi) long and up to 1 km (3,200 ft) deep, carved between the mountains of Bokšanica (from the west) and Zvijezda (from the east). The villages of Sase, Resnik, Đurevići and Gornje Štitarevo lie in the gorge and the Kukal river flows into the Drina from the right. At the Slap village, the Drina receives the Žepa river from the right and turns sharply to the west, becoming a border river between Bosnia and Herzegovina and Serbia near the village of Jagoštica.

Flowing on the western slopes of the mountainous Azbukovica, the Drina passes next to the villages of Gvozdac, Okletac, Strmovo, Bačevci, Donje Košlje, Drlače, Vrhpolje, Donja Bukovica (in Serbia), Boljevići, Fakovići, Tegare, Sikirići and Voljevica (in Bosnia and Herzegovina), before it reaches the towns of Ljubovija in Serbia, the centre of the Azbukovica region (or Upper Podrinje from the Serbian side), and Bratunac, in Bosnia and Herzegovina, the centre of the Ludmer region. Here the Drina receives the right tributary of Ljuboviđa and continues between the mountains of Jagodnja and Boranja (in Serbia), and Glogova (in Bosnia and Herzegovina). After the ruins of the medieval town of Mikuljak and the villages of Mičići, Uzovnica, Crnča, Voljevci (in Serbia), Krasanovići, Dubravice, Polom and Zelinje (in Bosnia and Herzegovina), the Drina is flooded again, this time by the artificial Zvornik Lake, created by damming for the exploitation by the Zvornik Hydroelectric Power Station. The villages of Amajic, Culine (in Serbia), Sopotnik, Drinjača and Djevanje (in Bosnia and Herzegovina) are located on the lake. This is also where the Drinjača river flows into the Drina (now the Zvornik lake) from the left, flowing from the Bosnian region of Gornji Birač.

==== Lower Drina ====
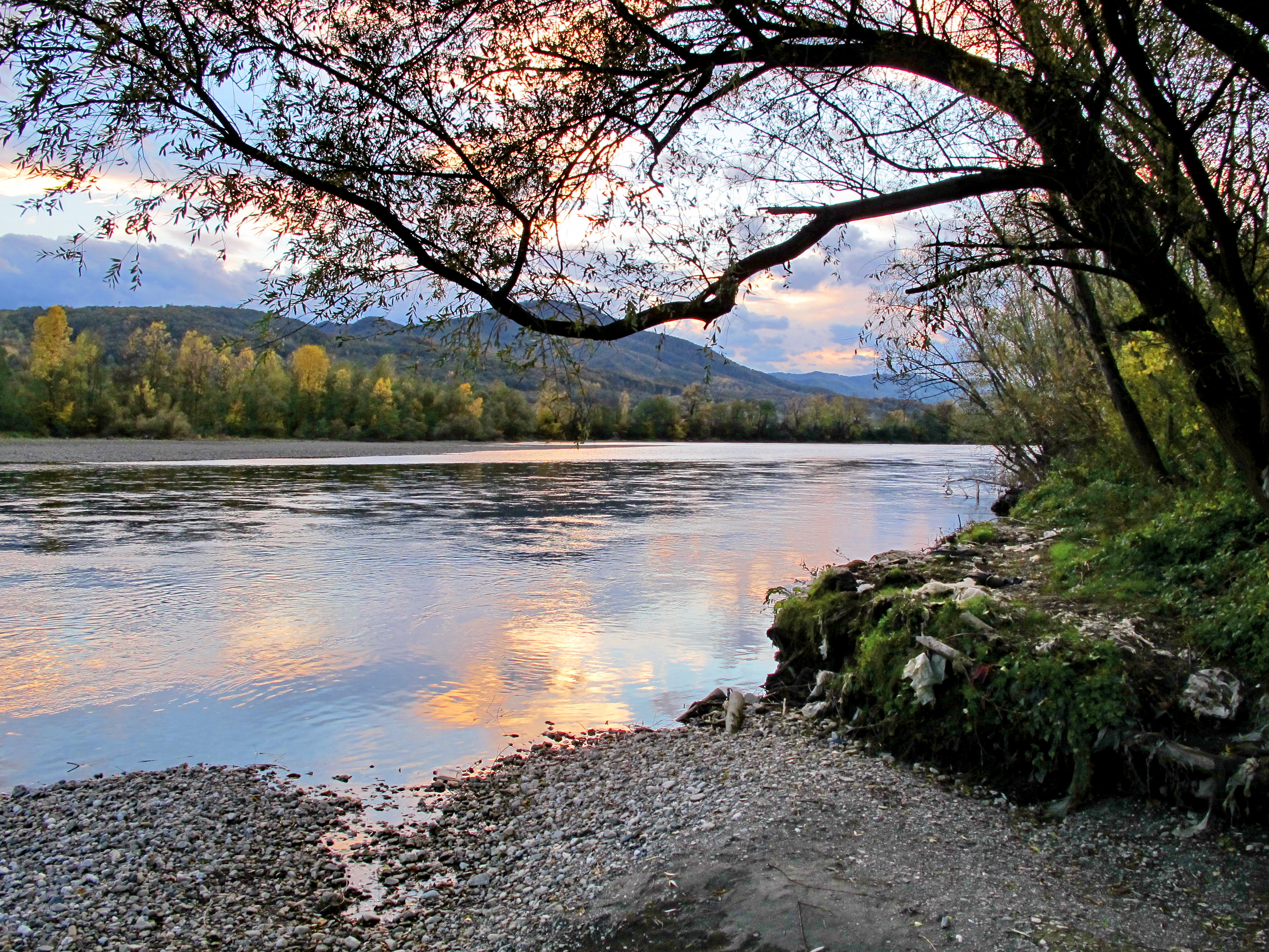
Drina near to Ljubovija.

After the dual town of Zvornik (Bosnia and Herzegovina)-Mali Zvornik (Serbia), the Drina flows between the Bosnian mountain of Majevica and the Serbian mountain of Gučevo, and enters the Lower Podrinje region. For the rest of its flow after the village of Kozluk, it has no major settlements on the Bosnian side (except for the town of Janja, which is several km away from the river, and some smaller settlements, like Branjevo and Glavičice). On the Serbian side, the Drina passes next to the villages of Brasina and Rečane, the ruins of the medieval town of Koviljkin grad, the spa and town of Banja Koviljača, the industrial town and center of the Podrinje region, Loznica, and its largest suburb, Lozničko Polje.

The Drina enters the confluence region of its course, the southern Pannonian plain, including the Serbian regions of Jadar (where it receives the Jadar river) and Iverak (where it receives the Lešnica). This is where the rivers spills in many arms and flows, creating the largest flood plain in former Yugoslavia, which the river divides in half. The east side, Mačva, is in Serbia, and the west side, Semberija, in Bosnia and Herzegovina (where it receives the Janja river). The Drina spills over and meanders, forming shallows, islands and sandbars, before emptying into the Sava river between the Serbian village of Crna Bara and the Bosnian Bosanska Rača. The variability of the water flow and low altitude resulted in several course changes during history. The Drina previously flowed into the Sava river near Šabac, 30 km (19 mi) to the east of the present mouth.

== Ecology and wildlife ==
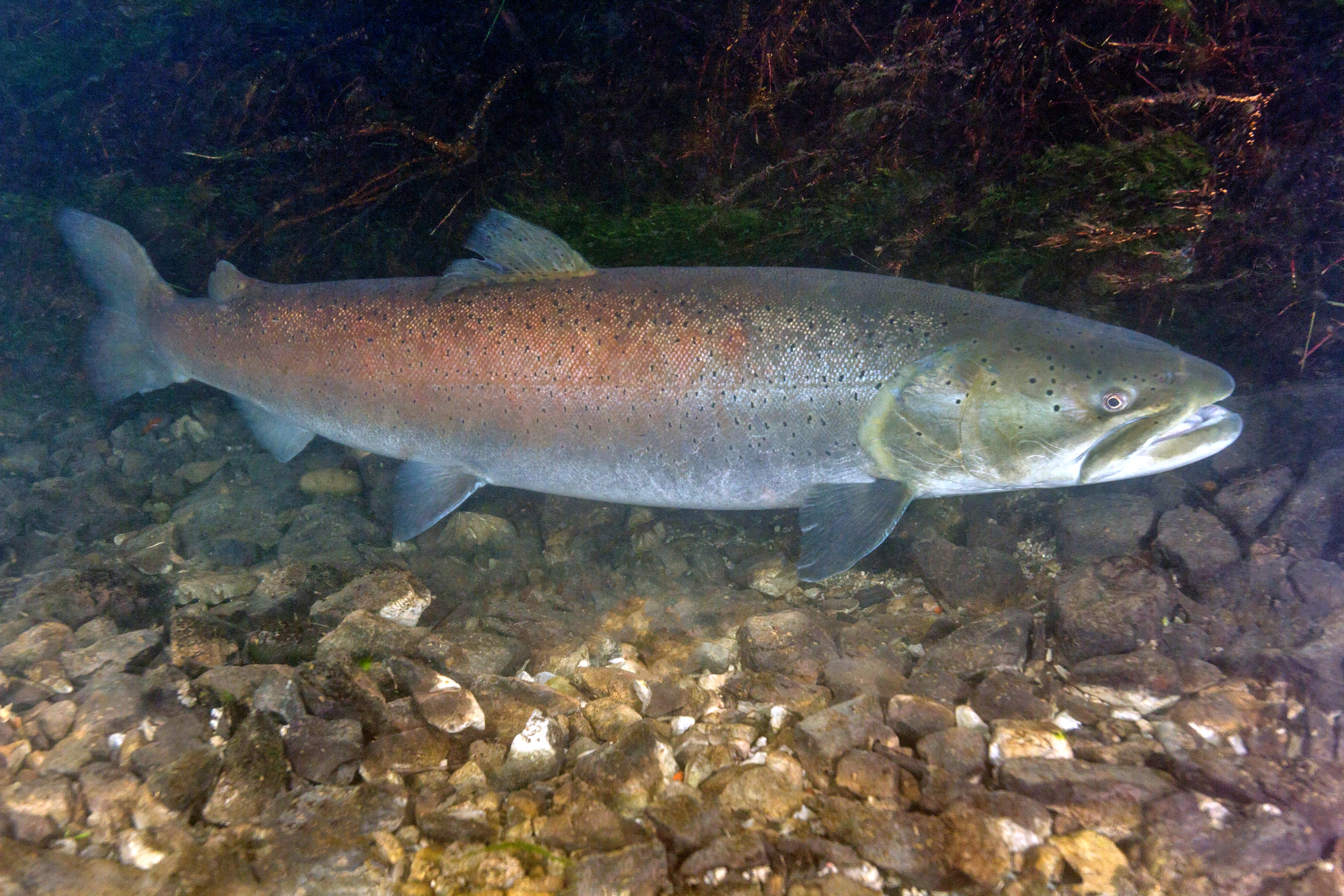
Drina is major habitat of huchen (hucho hucho), also known as Danube salmon.

The Drina river, together with its source tributaries, the Tara and the Piva river before damming, and most major headwater tributaries such as Bistrica, Čehotina, Lim, Prača, Drinjača, are still Europe's primer habitat and spawning grounds for endangered salmonid fish species, huchen (Latin: Hucho hucho). However, intensive hydropower harnessing, with damming without the construction of fish ladder facilities, interrupting the river course, so far in three places (three hydro-electric power plants), separating populations DNA groups from each another and from its prey species, while obstructing movements longitudinally along the river, preventing it from reaching the spawning grounds in upper reaches of the basin.

In the basin of the Drina there are few designated protected areas so far. The Drina National Park is recently established around the Drina river in Bosnia and Herzegovina, and in the summer of 2017 a law designating the protected zone was passed.

In the 21st century, the river has become known for the large accumulation of waste, especially in winter.

== Tourism ==
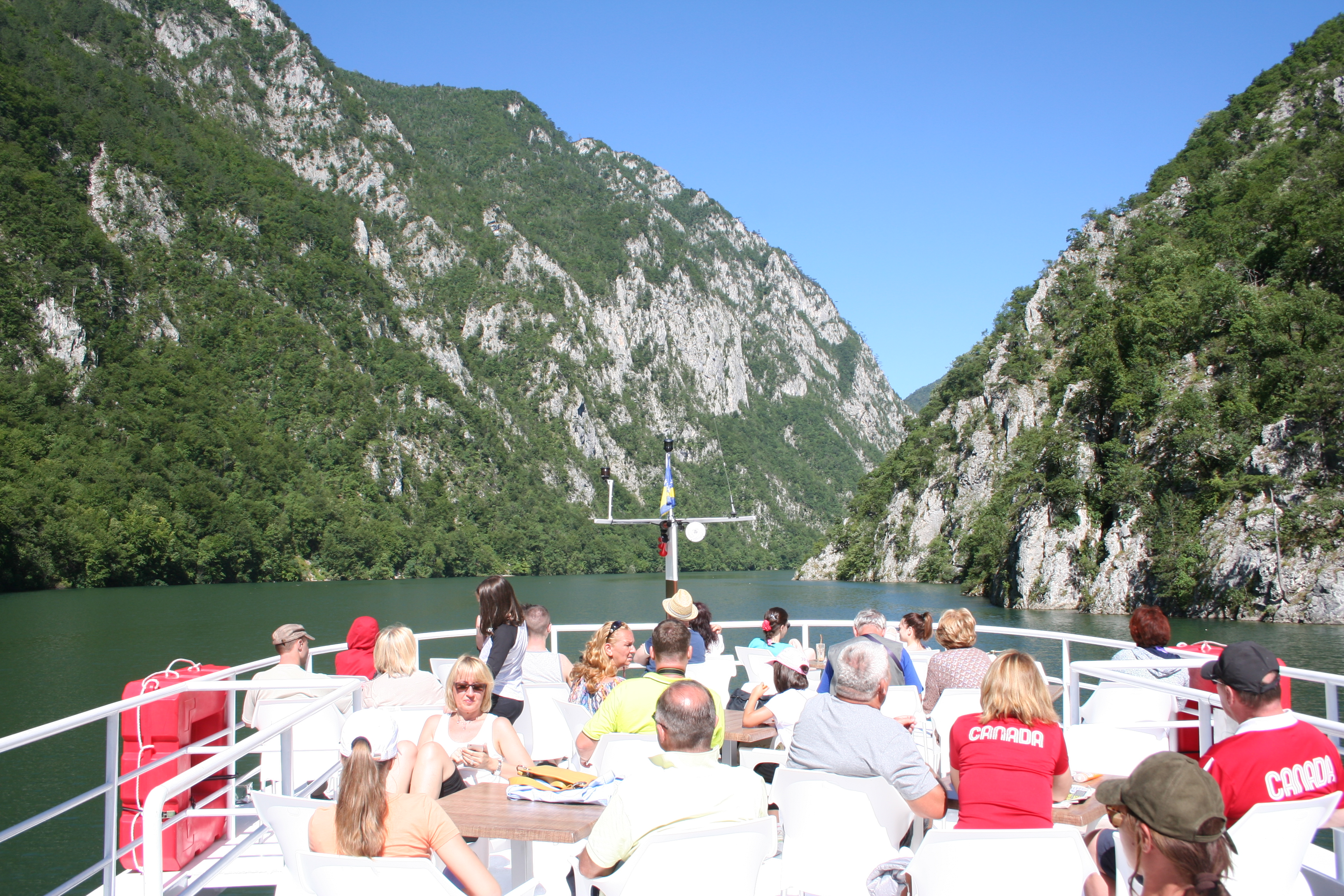
Upper Drina.

The Drina is part of the rafting route, which includes the Tara river. There are various rafting routes, depending on the length, including 18 kilometres (11 mi) miles long one-day runs from Brstnovica to Sćepan Polje.

The Drina Regatta is the annual tourist and recreational event, organised by S.T.C. "Bajina Bašta" and the municipality of Bajina Bašta since 1994. The regatta is the most visited event in Western Serbia, and central summer event on the water in the region.

The Šargan Eight is a narrow-gauge heritage railway in Serbia, running from the village of Mokra Gora to Šargan Vitasi station, with an extension to Višegrad in Bosnia and Herzegovina, finished on 28 August 2010. The route includes the transfer of passengers to a boating tour along the Perućac lake.

== Hydropower ==
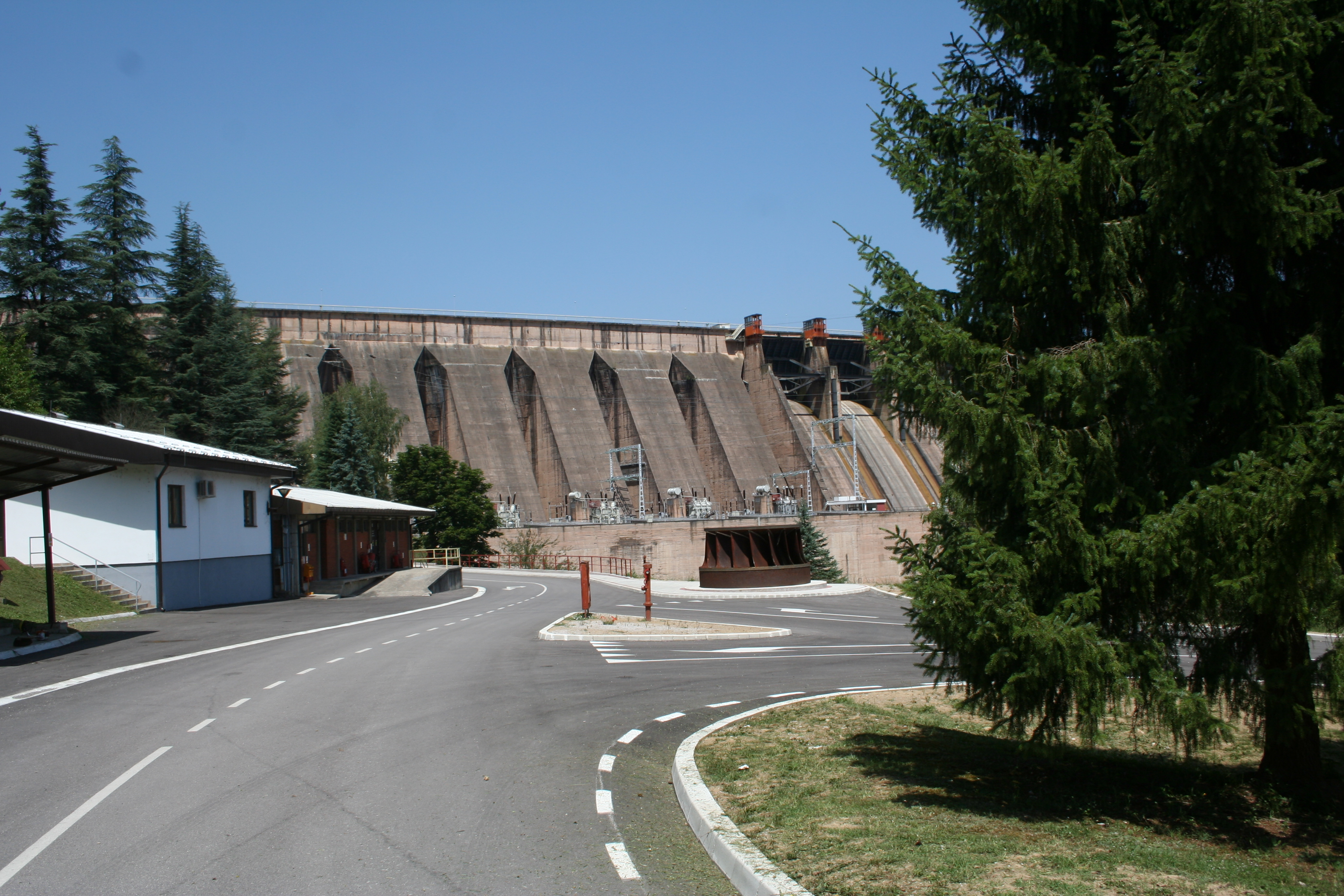
HE Bajina Bašta.

The Drina originates at an altitude of 432 meters (1,417 feet) and flows into the Sava at 75 meters (246 feet). The large inclination is not constant because of many gorges and bends, but still more than enough to generate an estimated 6 billion kilowatt-hours of potential electrical power.

Also, the discharge steadily grows: 125 cubic metres per second (4,400 cu.ft./s) at the Ćehotina's mouth, and 370 cubic metres per second (13,000 cu.ft./s) on the Drina's mouth into the Sava. However, power capacity is not fully used since only three hydro electrical power stations (HE) have been constructed so far: HE Zvornik, HE Bajina Bašta, and HE Višegrad.

== Population ==
As a result of the inhospitable terrain and the lack of good railways and major roads, the surrounding territory is sparsely populated. Apart from many small villages, the major settlements on or near the river are:

- in Bosnia and Herzegovina: Foča, Goražde, Višegrad, Srebrenica, Bratunac, Zvornik, and Janja.
- in Serbia: Bajina Basta, Ljubovija, Mali Zvornik, Banja Koviljača, Loznica, Lozničko Polje, and Badovinci.

The Drina is crossed by several bridges: at Višegrad, Skelani, Bratunac and Zvornik (in Bosnia and Herzegovina), and Loznica and Badovinci in Serbia. The most recent bridge is the one at Badovinci, the Pavlovića ćuprija.

== Cultural-historical significance and heritage ==
The 2012–2015 archaeological survey at the Orlovine locality, right above the river near Mali Zvornik, showed that the visible remains (stone ramparts) are part of the much larger Byzantine city. The spacious settlement, larger than modern Mali Zvornik, originates from the period of emperor Justinian I. It had large administrative center and was bishop's seat. Younger levels are dated to the rule of Časlav of Serbia. Ramparts extended to the Drina itself. Discovered artefacts include amphorae, mosaics, glass objects, water cisterns, parts of arched gates, guard towers, and one of the largest Byzantine churches in Serbia, 30 by 60 m (98 by 197 ft), with luxurious cathedra. Works on the find continued into the 2020s.

In the northern section of Mali Zvornik, the underground shelter for the King Alexander I Karađorđević was dug into the rocky hill above the river in the 1930s. Envisioned as the war headquarters of the king and government, the construction began in 1931, but it was halted after the king was assassinated on 9 October 1934. Under the code name "Kamena devojka" ("Stone girl"), it was designed by the unnamed Russian engineer, and dug by the inmates who were transported blindfolded to the location. Underground fort spreads over 5,000 square metres (54,000 sq ft), with corridors reaching a total of 1.5 kilometres (0.93 mi). The "underground city" has 75 rooms, 12 exits with heavy metallic doors, kings suite, cabinet, halls, guardsmen dormitories, water spring, water well, three drinking fountains, and chapel dedicated to the Saint Andrew the First-Called. There is a constant temperature of 14 to 16 °C (57 to 61 °F). The entire complex was designed for 5,000 people. It was used only once, on the 9/10 April 1941, when the King Peter II Karađorđević presided over the session when it was decided that government will go into the exile. In the 21st century, the two thirds of the complex were renovated and adapted into the museum.

=== Mehmed Paša Sokolović Bridge ===
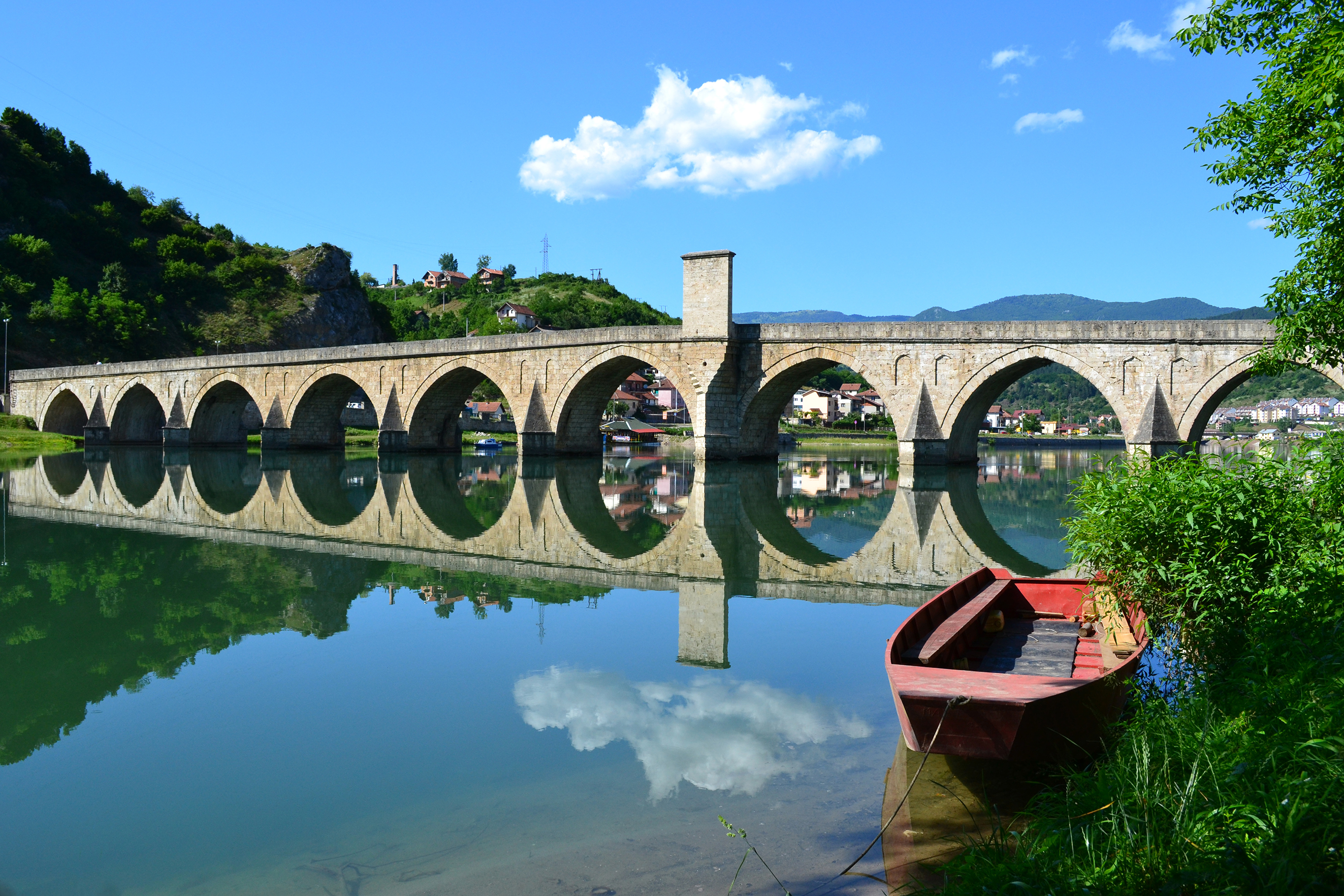
World Heritage-listed Mehmed Paša Sokolović Bridge in Višegrad, Bosnia and Herzegovina.

Commissioned by Grand Vizier Mehmed Paša Sokolović, the historic bridge, that today bears his name, the Mehmed Paša Sokolović Bridge, is constructed in Višegrad, in eastern Bosnia and Herzegovina, between 1571 and 1577. It was designed by the Ottoman court architect Mimar Sinan, and its representative part of Bosnia and Herzegovina heritage, protected by the Commission to Preserve National Monuments of Bosnia and Herzegovina, and included into UNESCO's 2007 World Heritage List.

=== Jelav monoxyl ===
In September 2011, after local floods, an ancient boat was discovered, buried under the gravel in the Drina river, near Jelav, some 10 km (6.2 mi) north of Loznica. It is the first one in the Drina valley which was discovered in one piece and in such a good shape. The boat is 7.1 m (23 ft) long, 1.3 m (4 ft 3 in) wide and with the circumference of the back section of 4 m (13 ft). When dug out, it weighed 2 tons, but after drying out for two years in natural conditions, it was reduced to 1.3 tons. After being dried, it went through the conservation process in 2013. As the local museum in Loznica had no space to exhibit such a big item, a special annexe was built especially for the monoxyl. It is estimated that it was made between 1740 and 1760 from the trunk of an oak that was 230 to 300 years old when cut. Based on the marks on it, this particular boat was most likely used for the transportation of the bulk cargo from one side of the river to another, as it seems to be too massive to be operated by the oars. Cuts and marks on it indicate that it was probably pulled over the river by the horses. It is possible that later when it went out of service, it was used as the foundation of a watermill.

=== World War I ===
During World War I, from September 8 to September 16, 1914, the Drina was the battlefield for battles between the Serbian and Austro-Hungarian army, the Battle of Cer and Battle of Drina. The Austro-Hungarians engaged in a significant offensive over the Drina river at the western Serbian border, resulting in numerous skirmishes and battles.

== In popular culture ==
In its lower, meandering course, the Drina is referred to as the kriva Drina ("bent Drina"). This has entered Serbian as a phrase used when someone wants to resolve an unsolvable situation; it is said that he or she wants to "straighten the bent Drina".

During World War I, from September 8 to September 16, 1914, the Drina was the battlefield of bloody battles between the Serbian and Austro-Hungarian army, the Battle of Cer and Battle of Drina. In honour of the former battle, the Serbian composer Stanislav Binički (1872–1942) composed the 'March on the Drina', and in 1964 a movie of the same title was shot by director Žika Mitrović. The movie was later banned for a period of time by the Communist government, because of its portrayal of a true-to-life, bloody battle, and its use of Binički's march (banned at that time) as part of the soundtrack. The Slovenian band Laibach did a cover version of the 'March on the Drina' titled "Marš on the River Drina" in their album NATO, released in 1994 during the Yugoslav Wars.

The most significant cultural reference to the river and its most emblematic feature, the bridge of Mehmed Paša Sokolović, is made in the 1945 novel Na Drini ćuprija (transl. The Bridge on the Drina), by the Nobel laureate, Ivo Andrić. The book is about the building of Mehmed Paša's bridge near Višegrad, by the Ottomans in the 16th century.

Outside of Bosnia and Serbia, the rivers play a role in some nationalist circles within Bulgaria. The song by the Bulgarian band Zhendema under the title "Разговор с дядо" (A conversation with grandfather) encapsulates the ambitions of Bulgarian veterans of the Great War that Bulgaria would stretch from the Drina river in the west all the way to the Black Sea in the east, encompassing all ethnic-Bulgarians in one nation.

== See also ==
- Sutjeska National Park
- Blessed Martyrs of Drina
- Drina Regatta
- List of national parks of Bosnia and Herzegovina

== Sources ==
- Mala Prosvetina Enciklopedija, Third edition (1985); Prosveta; ISBN 86-07-00001-2
- Demiraj, Shaban (2006). The origin of the Albanians (linguistically investigated). Tirana: Academy of Sciences of Albania. ISBN 978-99943-817-1-5.
- Jovan Đ. Marković (1990): Enciklopedijski geografski leksikon Jugoslavije; Svjetlost-Sarajevo; ISBN 86-01-02651-6
- Slobodan Ristanović: "Prvenac na Drini"
