= Jadar =

Jadar may refer to:

- Jadar (Drina), a river in western Serbia, tributary to the Drina
- Jadar (Drinjača), a river in eastern Republika Srpska, Bosnia and Herzegovina, tributary to the Drinjača
- Studeni Jadar (Cold Jadar), a river in eastern Republika Srpska, Bosnia and Herzegovina, tributary to Jadar (Drinjača)
- Jadar (Serbia), a region surrounding the Jadar river in western Serbia
- Jadar (mineral), sodium lithium boron silicate hydroxide
- Jadar, Yemen
- Jæren, a flatland area central to Rogaland, Norway
