= Jelav =

Jelav Јелав (Serbian)
- Village (Selo)
- Location within Serbia
- Coordinates: 44°37′N 19°16′E
- Country: Serbia
- District: Mačva District
- Municipality: Loznica

Population (2011)
  - Total: 854
- Time zone: UTC+1 (CET)
  - Summer (DST): UTC+2 (CEST)

Historical population
Year	Pop.	±%
1948	909	—
1953	950	+4.5%
1961	987	+3.9%
1971	977	−1.0%
1981	883	−9.6%
1991	825	−6.6%
2002	849	+2.9%
2011	854	+0.6%

Jelav is a village in the municipality of Loznica, Serbia. According to the 2011 census, the village has a population of 854.

== Jelav Monoxyl ==
In September 2011, after local floods, a top an ancient boat appeared protruding out of the gravel on the Drina river, near Jelav, some 10 km (6.2 mi) north of Loznica. Experts immediately grasped its value, and began slowly to dig out the vessel. While they were developing the procedure and preparing the documents, one of the locals took the initiative and dragged the boat out of the river with his tractor.

The boat is a massive monoxyl, or the dugout canoe. It is the first one in the Drina valley which was discovered in one peace and in such a good shape. The boat is 7.1 m (23 ft) long, 1.3 m (4 ft 3 in) wide and with the circumference of the back section of 4 m (13 ft). When dug out, it weighed 2 tons, but after drying out for two years in natural conditions, it was reduced to 1.3 tons. After being dried, it went through the conservation process in 2013. As the local museum in Loznica had no space to exhibit such a big item, a special annex was built especially for the monoxyl.

Monoxyls are the oldest types of boats. They are made out of one massive piece of wood, which is then dug and formed with the tools or the controlled fire. This specific type which was discovered in Jelav resembles the Celtic types of boats, which the Slavs, after settling on the Balkans, used as the basis for their boats. In this part of Europe they were usually made out of the oak trunks, as the oak is hard and much more waterproof than the other trees. Forest engineers calculated that for an oak to grow so much that you can carve the Jelav monoxyl out of it, in the Podrinje and Jadar regions it had to grow from 230 to 300 years.

The Ruđer Bošković Institute in Zagreb tested the specimen and estimated that the tree was cut between 1695 and 1915. Based on characteristics, the way the boat was made and the fact that by the 1860s proper ships replaced completely momoxyls on the Drina, it is estimated that the Jelav monoxyl was made between 1740 and 1760. Traversing through this area in the 17th century, Ottoman traveler Evliya Çelebi noted that people in the Drina valley cut 40 m (130 ft) tall oak trees and make boats out of them. Based on the marks on it, this particular boat was most likely used for the transportation of the bulk cargo from one side of the river to another, as it seems to be too massive to be operated by the oars. Cuts and marks on it indicate that it was probably pulled over the river by the horses. It is possible that later, when it went out od service, it was used as the foundation of a watermill.
