= Sase =

Sase or SASE, may refer to:

== Places ==
- Sase, Srebrenica, a village in Bosnia and Herzegovina
- Sase (Višegrad), a village in Bosnia and Herzegovina
- Sase Monastery, in Bosnia and Herzegovina
- Sase prospect, a copper mine in the Democratic Republic of the Congo

== People ==
- Sase Narain (1925–2020), Guyanese politician and lawyer
- Tatsuya Sase (佐瀬 達也; born 1991), Japanese footballer

== Groups, organizations ==
- Society for the Advancement of Socio-Economics (SASE), an academic association based in the US, founded in 1989 by Amitai Etzioni.
- Society of Asian Scientists and Engineers (SASE), an American professional and collegiate organization founded in November 2007 to help Asian heritage scientific and engineering professionals.
- Sarajevo Stock Exchange (SASE), in Bosnia and Herzegovina
- Snow and Avalanche Study Establishment (SASE), a laboratory of the India Defence Research & Development Organization

== Other uses ==
- Şase, the number six in the Romanian language
- Secure access service edge (SASE), a networking and security technology
- Self-addressed stamped envelope (SASE), used for expediting a reply via mail
- Self-amplified spontaneous emission (SASE), a process by which a laser beam is created
- Specific application service element (SASE), in the OSI computer networking model

== See also ==
- SASES
- Sases
