= Jadar (Drina) =

Jadar (Јадар)
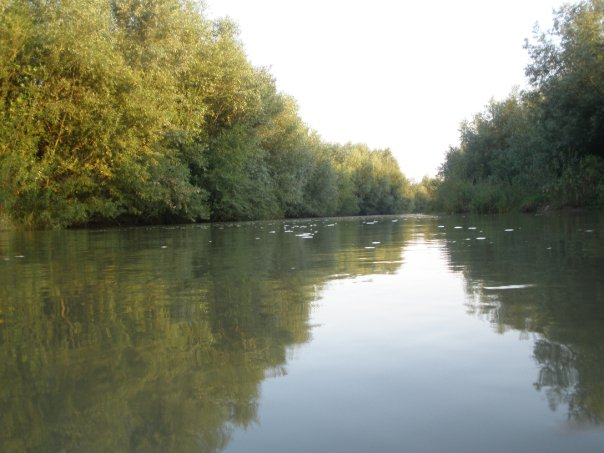

Location
- Country: Serbia

Physical characteristics
- Source
  - location: Vlašić mountain, northwest Serbia
- Mouth
  - location: Drina, near Straža, Loznica
  - coordinates: 44°38′53″N 19°15′18″E
- Length: 75 km (47 mi)

Basin features
- Progression: Drina→ Sava→ Danube→ Black Sea

The Jadar (Serbian Cyrillic: Јадар, pronounced [jǎːdar]) is a river in western Serbia, 75 km long right tributary of the Drina river. The Jadar also gives the name to the Jadar region of western Serbia. Also, the mineral Jadarite is named after the river.

== River ==
The Jadar originates from the southern slopes of the Vlašić mountain, northeast of the town of Valjevo, in the northeastern tip of the Podgorina region. Several streams flow south and join near the village of Osladić. Soon, at the village of Dragijevica, the Jadar turns sharply to the northwest, a general direction the river will follow until it meets the Drina.

The first larger settlement on the river is the regional center of Osečina after which the Jadar receives the Pecka river (Cyrillic: Пецка) from the left. After the villages of Komirić, Ravnaja and Mojković, the river receives another important left tributary, the Likodra river, near the village and former mine of Zavlaka. The Jadar continues next to the villages of Brezovice, Radinac [where it receives another left tributary, the Rakovica River (Cyrillic: Раковица), Brnjaci, Draginac, Bradić, Lipnica, Gornji Dobrić and Kozjak, before it empties into the Drina, near the Straža village, just south of the town of Janja in Republika Srpska, Bosnia and Herzegovina.

The Jadar belongs to the Black Sea drainage basin, drains an area of 894 km^{2} and it is not navigable. The river is notorious for its floods which happen almost on an annual basis. The section of the upper course (some 10 km) has been regulated in 1988, but the remaining 20 km until the Jadar's mouth into the Drina still has not. Only in 2005 the river spilled over 12 times (see 2005 European floods). The proposed project would also straighten the Jadar's mouth and make it 5 km shorter.

== See also ==
- Jadar (Serbia), a region in the river valley
