= Šćepan Polje =

Šćepan Polje Шћепан Поље
- Village
- Interactive map of Šćepan Polje
- Location within Montenegro
- Country: Montenegro
- Municipality: Plužine
- Time zone: UTC+1 (CET)
  - Summer (DST): UTC+2 (CEST)

Šćepan Polje (Montenegrin: Шћепан Поље, pronounced [ʃt͡ɕɛ̂paːn pɔ̂ʎɛ]) is the name of a small settlement and the region in Plužine Municipality, northwestern Montenegro. It is the border crossing point between Montenegro and Bosnia and Herzegovina, where the Tara river forms the border between the two countries. Right across the river and the state border is the village of Hum.

== History ==
Šćepan Polje was named after Herzog Stjepan Vukčić Kosača, medieval nobleman, who was known to the locals as Herceg Šćepan. On the hill above the settlement is the medieval Soko Grad, one of Stjepan's favorite residences. The fortress was destroyed by the Ottomans during their conquest of this part of the Kingdom of Bosnia. Below the Soko Grad is the monastery of the Serbian Orthodox Church dedicated to St. John the Baptist, known as the Zagrađe Monastery.

== Geography and location ==
The settlement and the region is surrounded on the north by the Tara canyon and on the west by the Piva canyon. The river Drina is formed near Šćepan Polje by merging Piva and Tara, on the territory of the municipality of Foča, Republika Srpska, Bosnia-Herzegovina. Šćepan Polje is located in Piva and Old Herzegovina, the historical regions of northwestern Montenegro.

=== Transport ===
The main road E762 leads through Šćepan Polje, which connects Plužine, with the municipality of Foča in Republika Srpska, the main road that connects Republika Srpska, Bosnia and Herzegovina with Montenegro.

=== Gallery ===
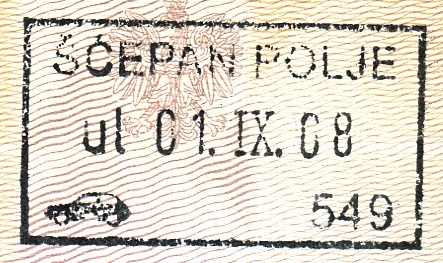
A passport stamp from Šćepan Polje, in 2008

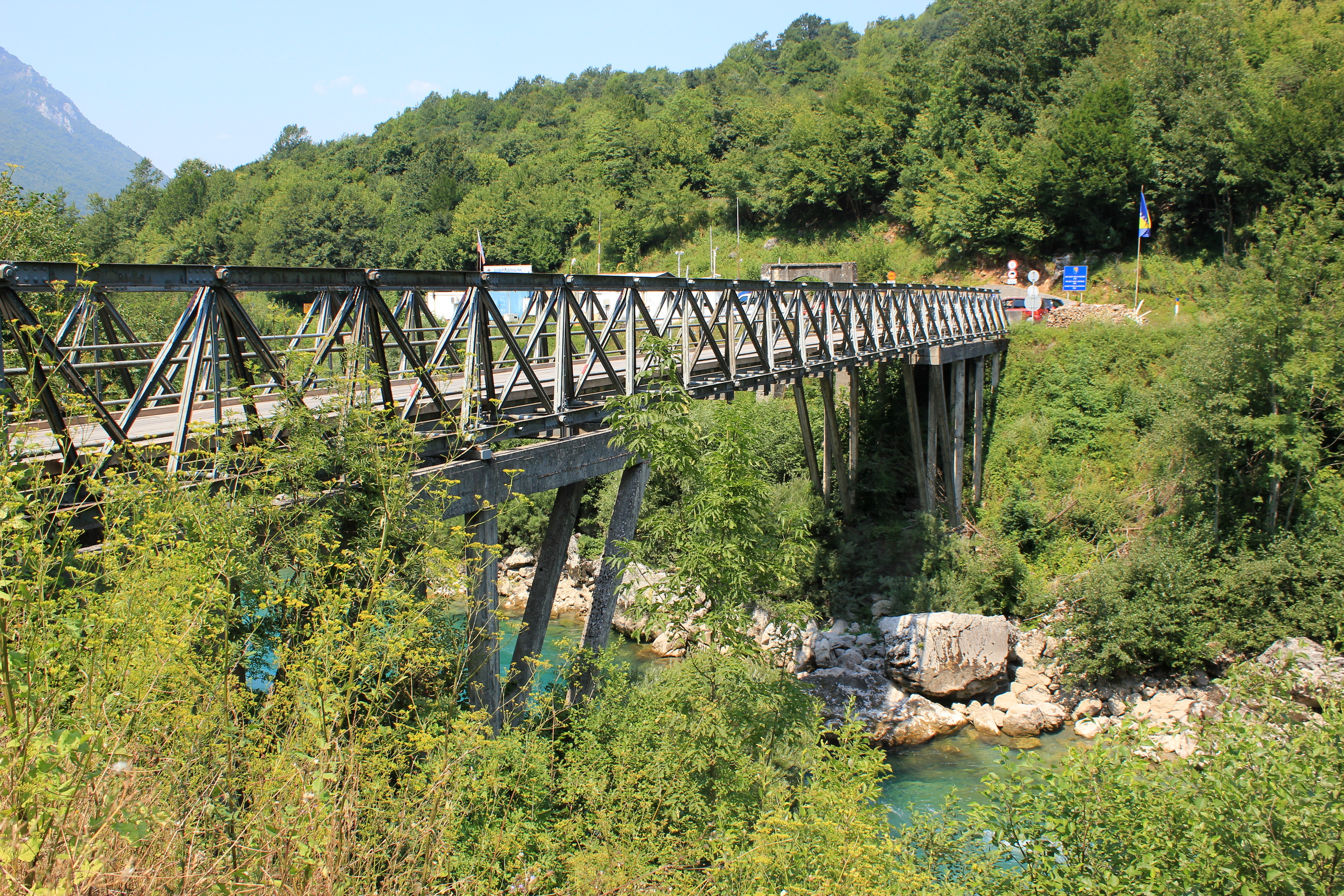
Border crossing point between Montenegro and Bosnia-Herzegovina

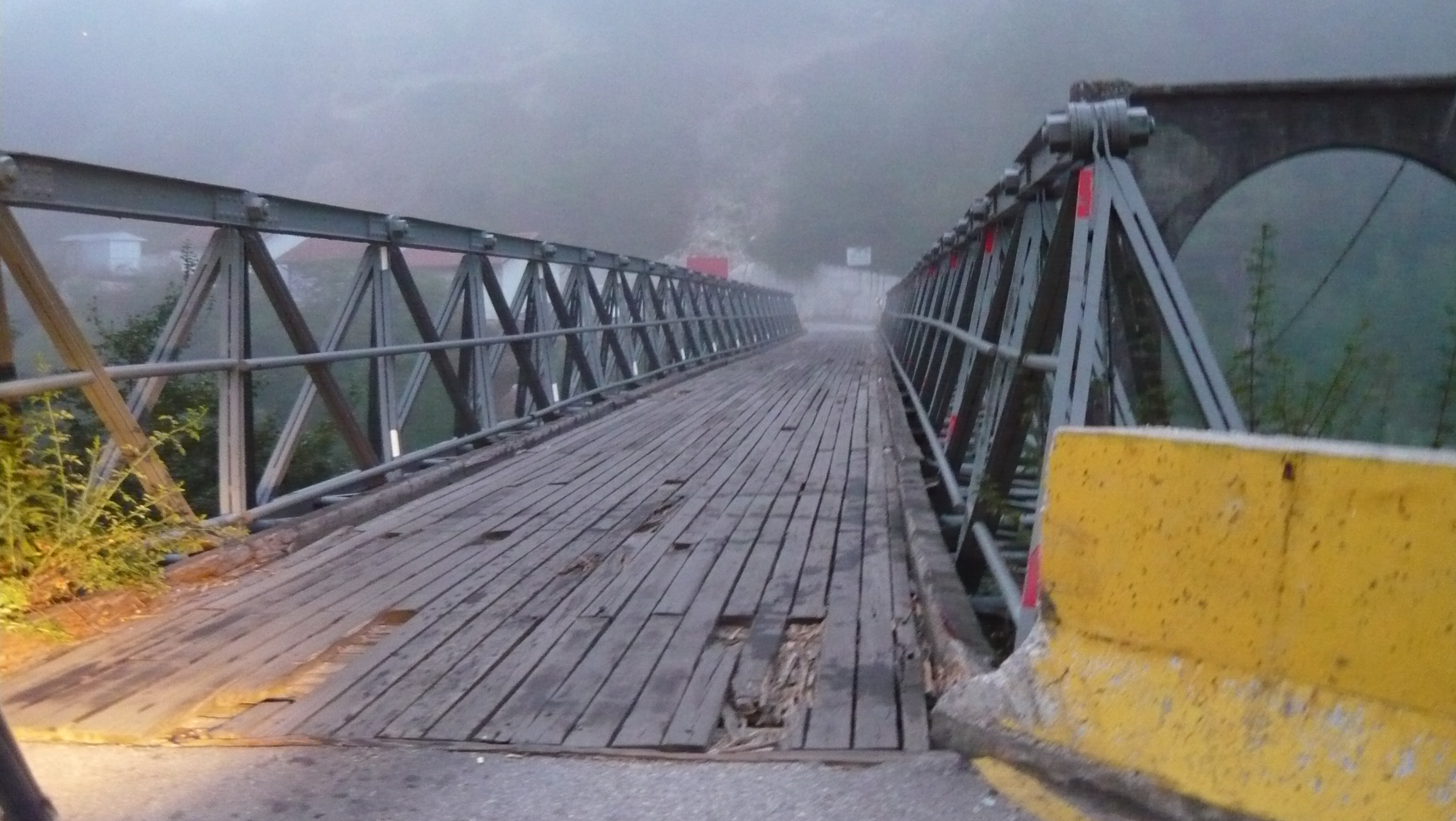
Border crossing point between Montenegro and Bosnia-Herzegovina

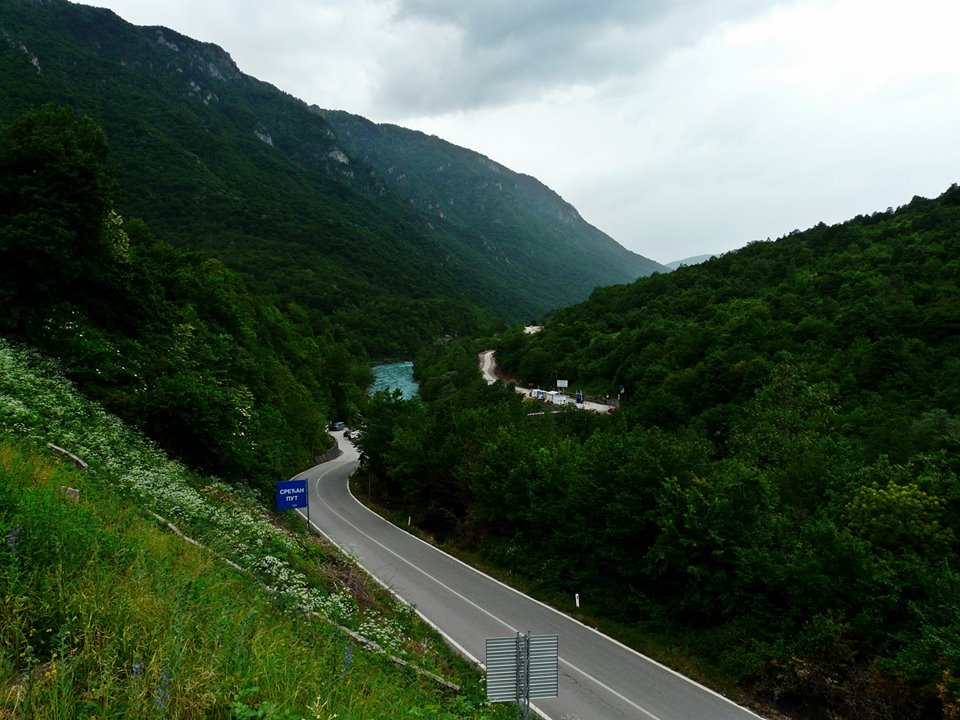
Border crossing point between Montenegro and Bosnia-Herzegovina

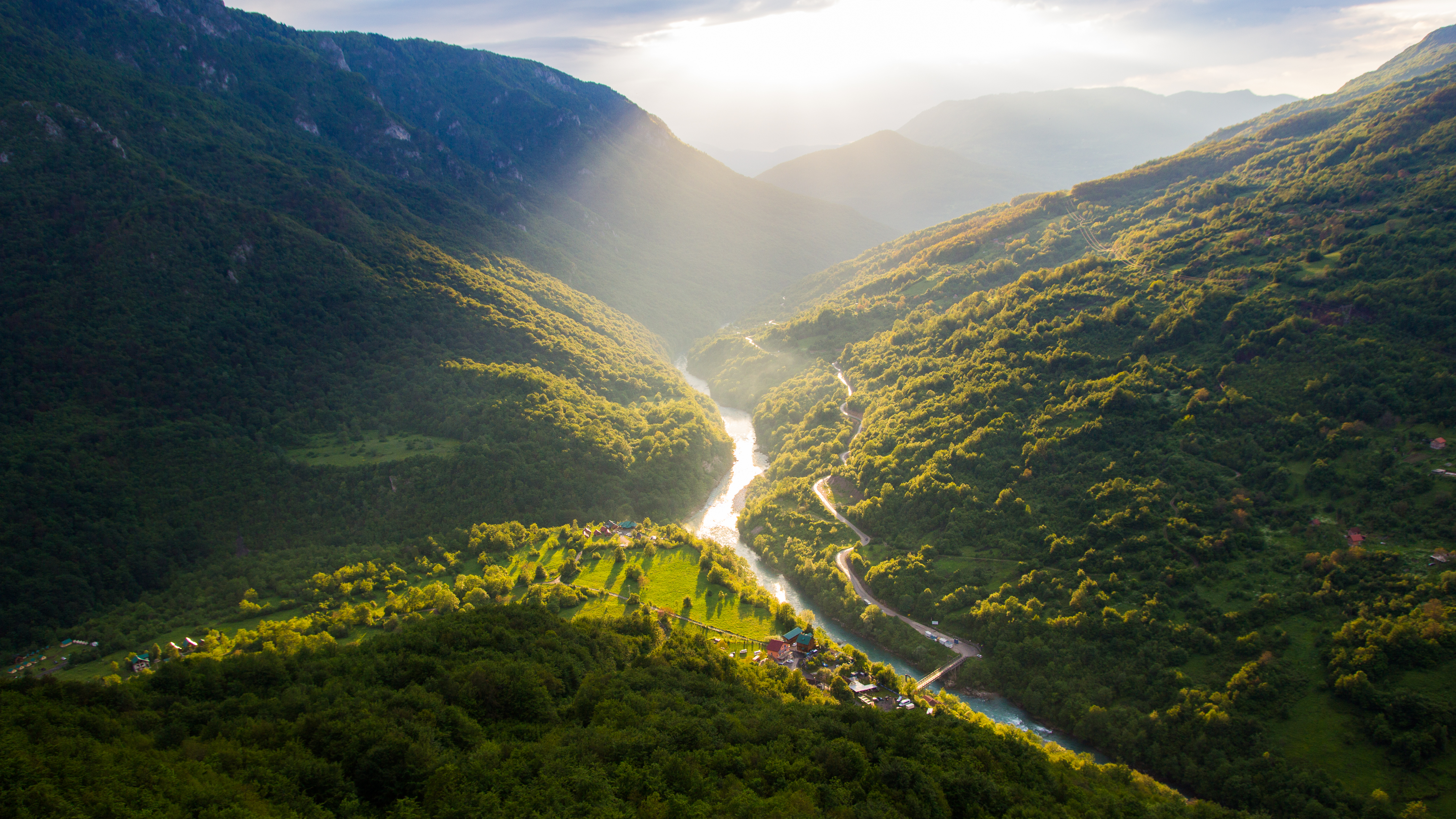
View of the confluence of the rivers Tara and Piva and the formation of the river Drina.
