= Zvijezda (Serbia) =

Mountain on the border of Bosnia and Herzegovina and Serbia

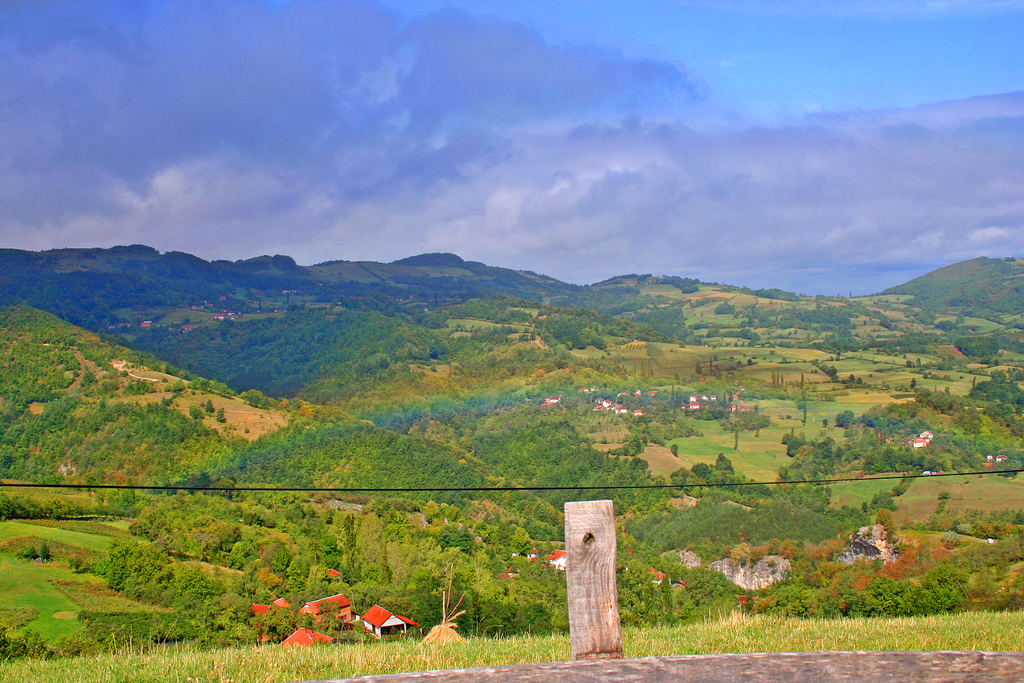

Highest point
- Elevation: 1,673 m (5,489 ft)
- Coordinates: 43°54′50″N 19°17′08″E

Geography
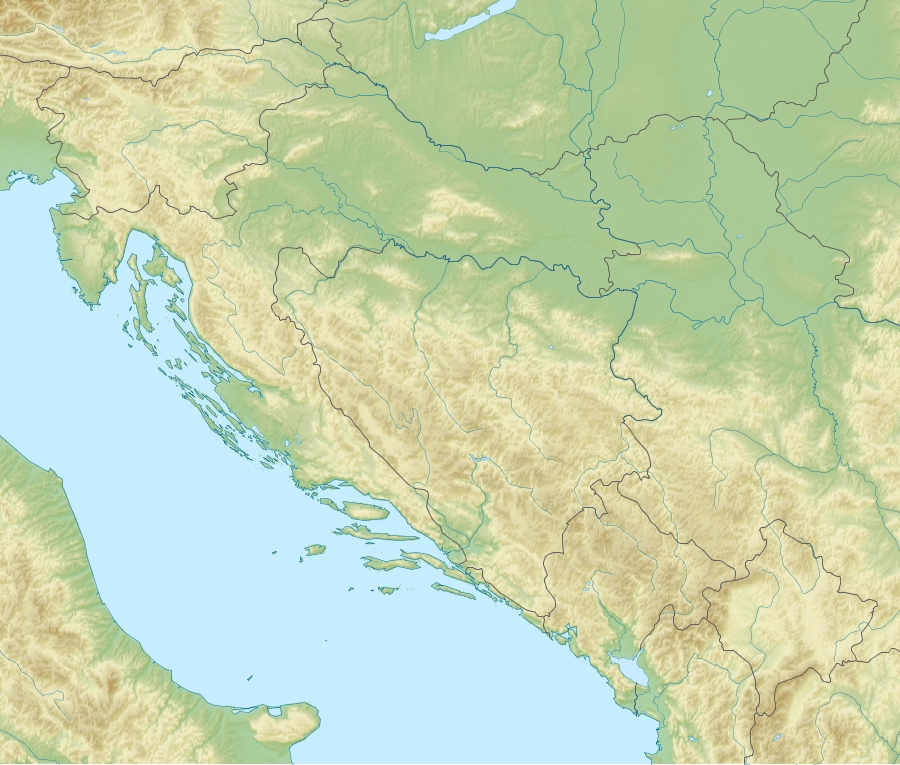
- Location within Dinaric Alps Location within Bosnia and Herzegovina Location within Serbia
- Location: Serbia / Bosnia and Herzegovina
- Parent range: Dinaric Alps

Zvijezda (Serbian Cyrillic: Звијезда) is a mountain on the border of Serbia and Bosnia and Herzegovina, between towns of Bajina Bašta and Višegrad. Its highest peak Veliki Stolac lies on Bosnian territory and has an elevation of 1,673 metres (5,489 ft) above sea level, followed by Kozji rid (1591m), Pivnice (1575m), Mrka kosa (1545m), and Lisnata glavica (1510m), on Serbian side. Zvijezda lies in a large bend of the Drina river and Serbian parts of the mountain fall within the Tara National Park.

A football club from the neighbouring town of Višegrad bears its name, FK Zvijezda.

== See also ==
- List of mountains in Bosnia and Herzegovina
- List of mountains in Serbia
