= Kosman =

- Village
- Location within Bosnia and Herzegovina
- Coordinates: 43°22′29″N 18°47′13″E
- Country: Bosnia and Herzegovina
- Entity: Republika Srpska
- Municipality: Foča
- Time zone: UTC+1 (CET)
  - Summer (DST): UTC+2 (CEST)

Kosman (Serbian Cyrillic: Косман) is a village in the municipality of Foča, Republika Srpska, Bosnia and Herzegovina.
