= Rogačica =

- Village (Selo)
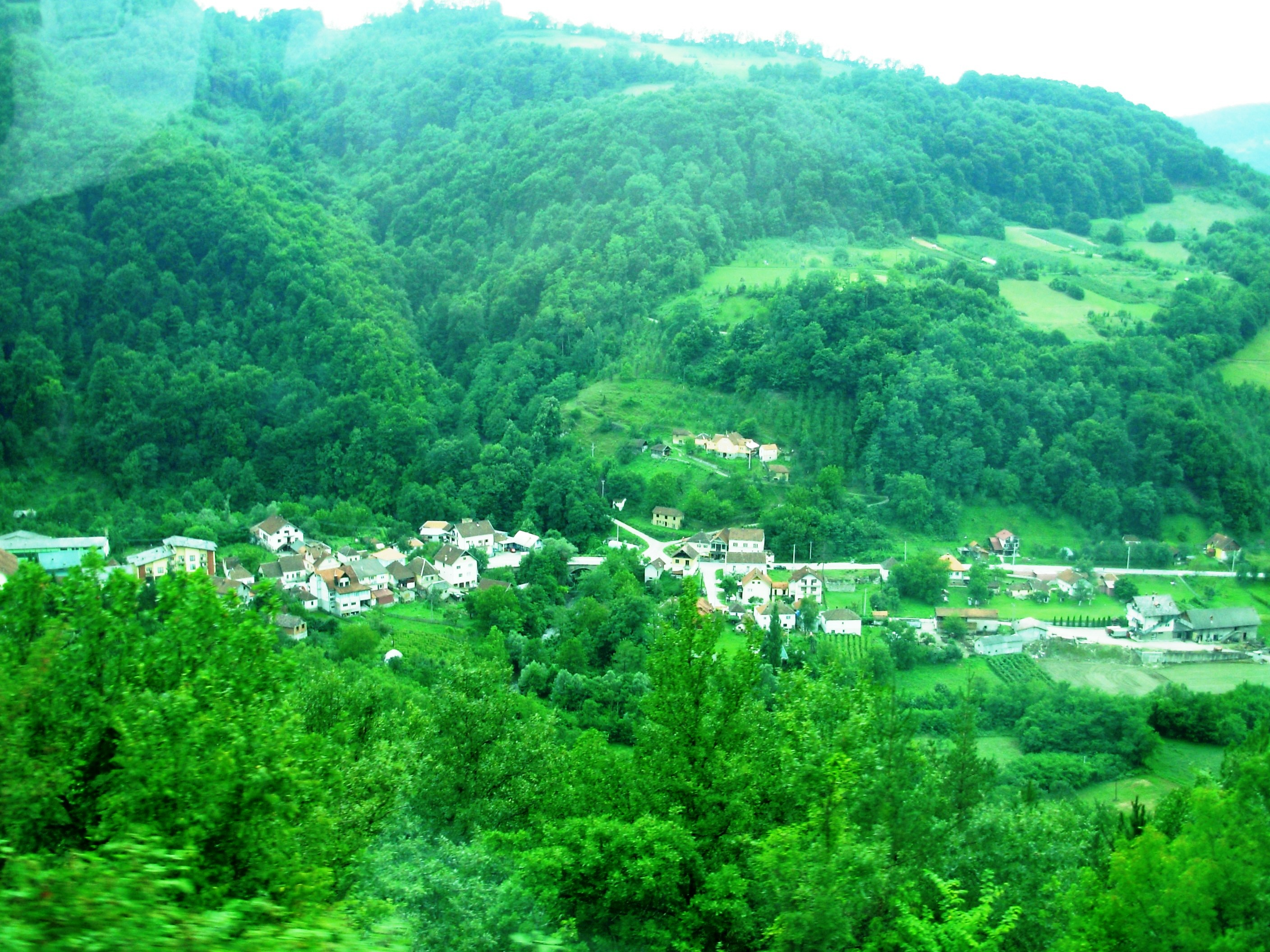

- Location within Serbia
- Coordinates: 44°02′N 19°37′E
- Country: Serbia
- District: Šumadija
- Municipality: Bajina Bašta

Population (2002)
  - Total: 768
- Time zone: UTC+1 (CET)
  - Summer (DST): UTC+2 (CEST)

Rogačica (Serbian Cyrillic: Рогачица) is a village in the municipality of Bajina Bašta, Serbia. According to the 2002 census, the village has a population of 768 people.
