= Vitkovići (Goražde) =

Vitkovići Витковићи
- Village
- Location within Bosnia and Herzegovina
- Coordinates: 43°38′N 18°58′E
- Country: Bosnia and Herzegovina
- Entity: Federation of Bosnia and Herzegovina
- Canton: Bosnian-Podrinje Goražde
- Municipality: Goražde
- Founded: 1953

Area
  - Total: 0.23 sq mi (0.60 km^{2})

Population (2013)
  - Total: 942
  - Density: 4,100/sq mi (1,600/km^{2})
- Time zone: UTC+1 (CET)
  - Summer (DST): UTC+2 (CEST)
- Area code: +387 38

Vitkovići is a suburb in the city of Goražde, Bosnia and Herzegovina, around 5 kilometers south of the city centre.

Vitkovići was founded in 1953, a purpose-built new town to serve the then-new FAJ Azot chemical works, one of the largest chemical factories in former Yugoslavia, specialising in nitrogen-based chemicals and with its own a water-purifying works. The original citizens were drawn from all over Yugoslavia and the suburb thus had a very mixed ethnic make-up (now totally changed).

During the Serb-offensive of March–April 1994 it was reported by Bosniak media that the complex's storage tanks of ammonia and ethanol had been booby trapped and would be exploded if attacks continued. Had the threat been carried out this would have been effectively a suicide bombing on an urban scale, but the threats were not eventually carried out.

After the civil war FAJ Azot Vitkovići was divided into five separate industrial complexes for privatisation.

== Demographics ==
According to the 2013 census, its population was 942.

Ethnicity in 2013
Ethnicity	Number	Percentage
Bosniaks	913	96.9%
Serbs	11	1.2%
other/undeclared	18	1.9%
Total	942	100%

== Sports ==
Vitkovići's football team, Azot played at a stadium attached to the chemical complex. The stadium is reportedly in a state of serious deterioration having received no reconstruction since the 1992-1995 siege.
