= Jadar, Yemen =

Jadar جدر Jidr
- Village
- Location in Yemen
- Coordinates: 15.46363°N 44.17858°E
- Country: Yemen
- Governorate: Sanaa
- District: Bani Matar
- Elevation: 7,241 ft (2,207 m)
- Time zone: UTC+3 (Yemen Standard Time)

Jadar (Arabic: جدر), also transliterated as Jidr or Jadir, is a village in Bani al-Harith District of Amanat al-Asimah Governorate, Yemen. It consists of two parts, Jidr al-A‘la and Jidr al-Asfal.

== History ==
According to the 10th-century writer al-Hamdani, it was one of the villages granted by Sayf ibn Dhi Yazan to the Bani Shihab, a tribe now generally living in the area to the south of Sanaa.
