= Lozničko Polje =

Lozničko Polje Лозничко Поље (Serbian)
- Town
- Location within Serbia
- Coordinates: 44°33′N 19°12′E
- Country: Serbia
- District: Mačva District
- Municipality: Loznica

Population (2002)
  - Total: 7,922
- Time zone: UTC+1 (CET)
  - Summer (DST): UTC+2 (CEST)
- Postal code: 15300

Lozničko Polje (Serbian Cyrillic: Лозничко Поље) is a town in the municipality of Loznica, Serbia. According to the 2002 census, the town has a population of 7,922.
