= Zaugline =

- Village (Selo)
- Location within Serbia
- Coordinates: 43°56′N 19°30′E
- Country: Serbia
- District: Šumadija
- Municipality: Bajina Bašta

Population (2002)
  - Total: 348
- Time zone: UTC+1 (CET)
  - Summer (DST): UTC+2 (CEST)

Zaugline (Serbian Cyrillic: Зауглине) is a village in the municipality of Bajina Bašta, Serbia. According to the 2002 census, the village has a population of 348 people.
