= Sase (Višegrad) =

- Village
- Location within Bosnia and Herzegovina
- Coordinates: 43°49′0″N 19°16′53″E
- Country: Bosnia and Herzegovina
- Entity: Republika Srpska
- Municipality: Višegrad

Population (1991)
  - Total: 99
- Time zone: UTC+1 (CET)
  - Summer (DST): UTC+2 (CEST)

Sase (Serbian: Сасе) is a village in the municipality of Višegrad, Bosnia and Herzegovina.As of 1991 it had a population of 99 people, of which 54% were ethnic Serbs. The village lies in a gorge of the Drina River.
