= Resnik (Višegrad) =

- Village
- Location within Bosnia and Herzegovina
- Coordinates: 43°50′35″N 19°14′05″E
- Country: Bosnia and Herzegovina
- Entity: Republika Srpska
- Municipality: Višegrad
- Time zone: UTC+1 (CET)
  - Summer (DST): UTC+2 (CEST)

Resnik (Serbian: Ресник) is a village in the municipality of Višegrad, Bosnia and Herzegovina.
