= Janja =

Coordinates: 44°40′2″N 19°14′46″E

Janja Јања
- Village (Selo)
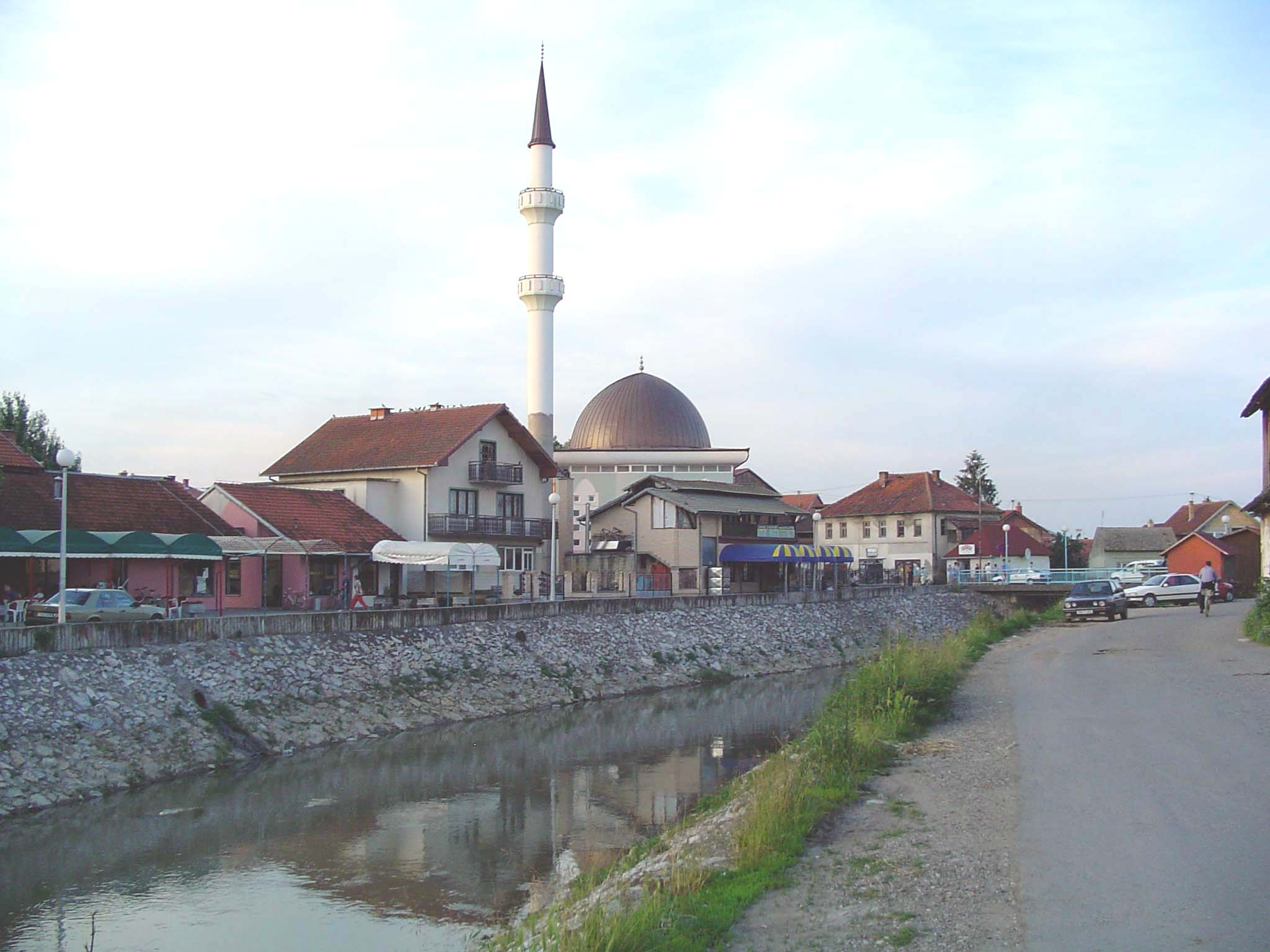

- Bijeljina municipality (dark blue)
- Country: Bosnia and Herzegovina
- Entity: Republika Srpska
- Municipality: Bijeljina

Population
  - Total: 12,333
- Time zone: UTC+1 (CET)
  - Summer (DST): UTC+2 (CEST)
- Area code: +387 55
- Website: Official website

Janja (Serbian Cyrillic: Јања) is a town in Bijeljina, Bosnia and Herzegovina. It is known as a place where the confluence of the rivers Janja and Drina is situated. It is the only Bosniak community in the municipality and consists of many displaced persons from other parts of Bosnia and Herzegovina.

== Location ==
Janja is a small town near Bijeljina in northeast Bosnia, located on the major road between Bijeljina and Zvornik.

Located in the center of Janja is the Atik Mosque. Janja has three mosques which were rebuilt after the war.

== History ==
There is no exact accurate source of when Janja was founded. From 1878 to 1961, Janja was municipality center. The 1991 census showed Janja had a population of 10,458. Part of Janja lies on the opposite side of the Drina River from the rest of the municipality.

== Demographics ==
=== 1971 ===
In 1971 Janja had a population of 7,945.

- Bosniaks - 6,495
- Serbs - 820
- Montenegrins - 301
- Croats - 210
- Albanians - 34
- Macedonians - 8
- Slovenes - 7
- Others - 80

According to the 2013 census, Janja had a population of 11,710.

Ethnic group	2013
Bosniaks	8,532 (72.86%)
Serbs	3,054 (26.08%)
Croats	17 (0.15%)
Others	107 (0.91%)

== Sport ==
- FK Podrinje Janja

== Gallery ==
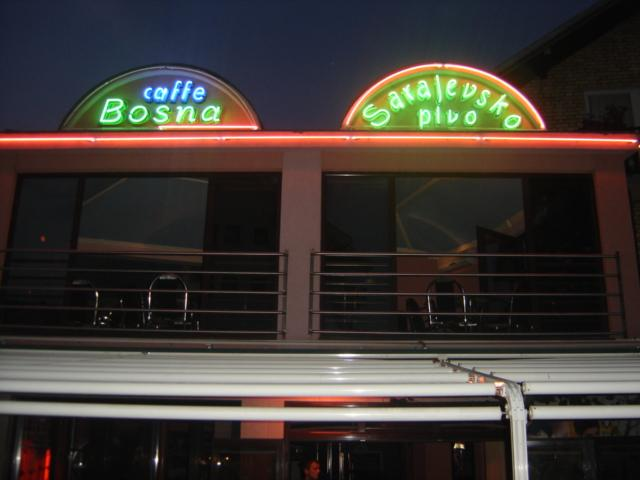
Caffe Bosna

Džedid Mosque

Džedid Mosque

View of Janja from the mosque

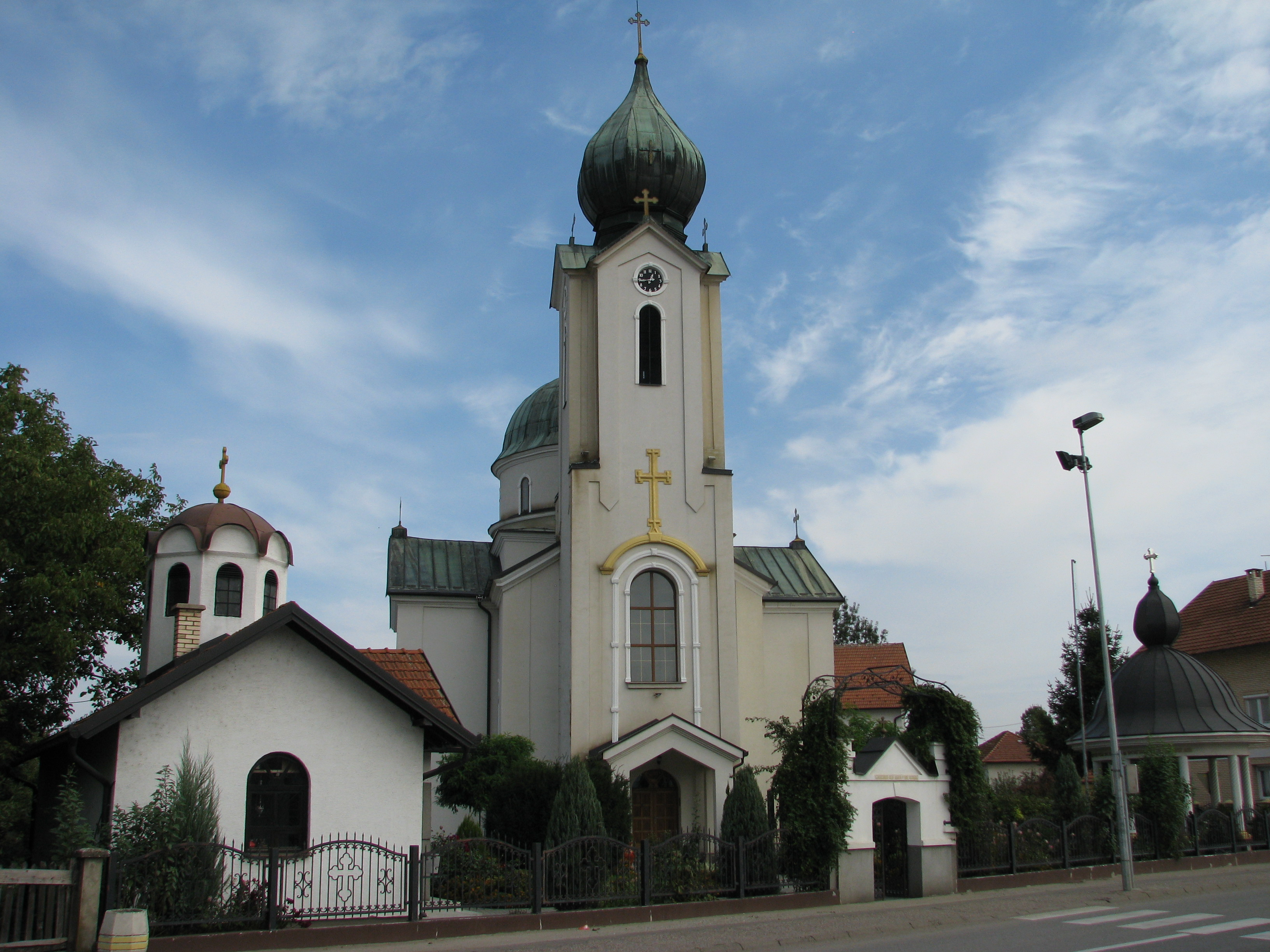
Church of St. Elijah
