= Osanica (Goražde) =

- Village
- Location within Bosnia and Herzegovina
- Country: Bosnia and Herzegovina
- Entity: Federation of Bosnia and Herzegovina
- Canton: Bosnian-Podrinje Goražde
- Municipality: Goražde

Area
  - Total: 0.79 sq mi (2.04 km^{2})
- Elevation: 1,198 ft (365 m)

Population (2013)
  - Total: 174
  - Density: 221/sq mi (85.3/km^{2})
- Time zone: UTC+1 (CET)
  - Summer (DST): UTC+2 (CEST)

Osanica is a suburb in the city of Goražde, Bosnia and Herzegovina. Osanica was also medieval župa, between 13th and 15th century.

== Demographics ==
According to the 2013 census, its population was 174.

Ethnicity in 2013
Ethnicity	Number	Percentage
Bosniaks	173	99.4%
other/undeclared	1	0.6%
Total	174	100%
