= Straža (Loznica) =

Straža Стража (Serbian)
- Village (Selo)
- Location within Serbia
- Coordinates: 44°37′N 19°17′E
- Country: Serbia
- District: Mačva District
- Municipality: Loznica

Population (2002)
  - Total: 1,018
- Time zone: UTC+1 (CET)
  - Summer (DST): UTC+2 (CEST)

Straža is a village in the municipality of Loznica, Serbia. According to the 2002 census, the village has a population of 1018 people.
