= Jadarite =

Nesosilicate mineral

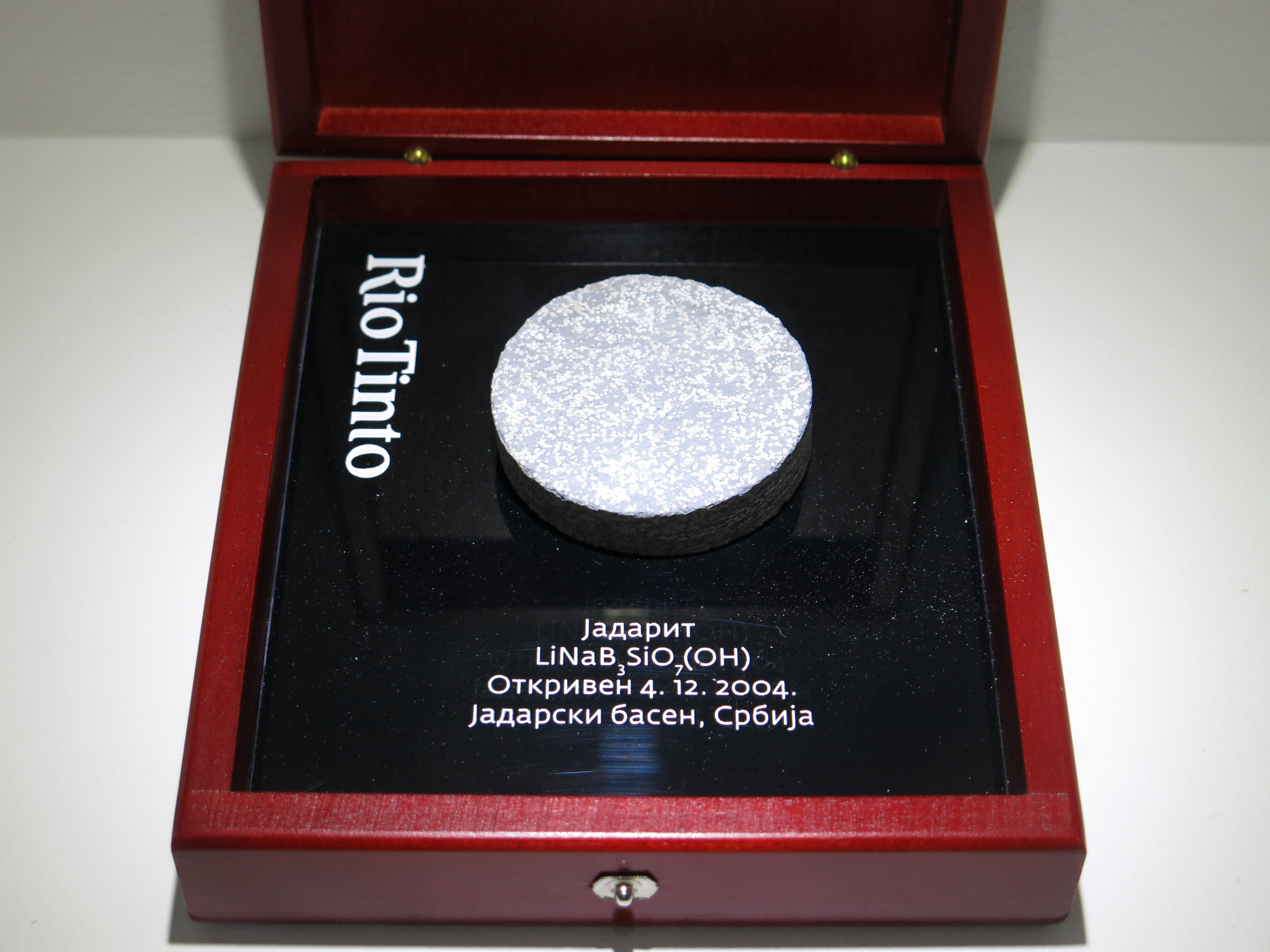
- Jadarite on display at the Natural History Center in Svilajnac, Serbia

General
- Category: Nesosilicate
- Formula: LiNaSiB_{3}O_{7}(OH)
- IMA symbol: Jad
- Strunz classification: 9.AJ.40
- Crystal system: Monoclinic
- Crystal class: Prismatic (2/m) (same H-M symbol)
- Space group: P2_{1}/n
- Unit cell: a = 6.816(2), b = 13.789(2) c = 6.758(2) [Å]; β = 111.08(2)°; Z = 4

Identification
- Formula mass: 219.46 g/mol
- Color: White
- Crystal habit: As microscopic anhedral grains
- Fracture: Irregular to conchoidal
- Tenacity: Brittle
- Mohs scale hardness: 4 - 5
- Luster: Dull
- Streak: White
- Diaphaneity: Translucent to opaque
- Specific gravity: 2.45
- Optical properties: Biaxial
- Ultraviolet fluorescence: Weak pink to orange under UV

Jadarite is a white, earthy monoclinic silicate mineral, sodium lithium boron silicate hydroxide with the chemical formula LiNaSiB_{3}O_{7}(OH).

== Discovery and classification ==
Jadarite was discovered in December 2004, in drill core from the Jadar Valley (Serbian: Јадар, Jadar, [jadaɾ]) in Serbia, from which it is named. The find was located 10 km (6.2 mi) southwest of the Cer mountain. Findings were originally located in the villages of Jarebice and Slatina and later in Draginac.

Exploration geologists from Rio Tinto Exploration discovered the mineral as small rounded nodules in drill core, and were unable to match it with previously known minerals. Jadarite was confirmed as a new mineral after scientists at the Natural History Museum in London and the National Research Council of Canada conducted tests on it.

== Commercialization ==
The mineral discovery may be commercially important because the mineral contains lithium and boron, both relatively rare industrially important elements. Lithium is used for lithium batteries; boron is used in alloys, ceramic, glasses, and other applications.

It was originally estimated that there are 200 million tons of the lithium borate ore, which would make the future Jadar mines one of the world's largest lithium deposits, supplying 10% of the world's demand for lithium. Later on, United States Geological Survey concluded that lithium supply is closer to 1.51% of world's demand for lithium. Of that, the Lower Jadar ore deposit has 114.5 million tons with an average content of the profitable components of 1.8% of lithium oxide and 13.1% of boron oxide.

In May 2017, Rio Tinto announced that the Jadar area has one of the largest lithium deposits in the world, lifting Lower Jadar's deposits to 136 million tons. The company stated that the ore deposit's mineral resource estimation confirmed the quality of the mineral. Extraction is scheduled to begin in 2023, with a projected underground exploitability of 50 years.

A jadarite processing plant next to the mines, which will process the ore into lithium carbonate and boric acid, is also planned. The prototype facility has been constructed by the scientists from Serbia, Australia, and USA, and is being tested in Melbourne. Testing includes the processing of the jadarite concentrate.

On 25 July 2017 a memorandum was signed by Rio Tinto and the Government of Serbia, represented by the prime minister Ana Brnabić, which confirmed the year 2023 as the starting year, but also revealed that only now the working groups will be formed, studies will be conducted, and the process of issuing the permits will begin. The entire enterprise was named "Project Jadar".

By 2020, future exploitation of jadarite and extraction of lithium instigated heated public and academic debate, especially after Rio Tinto's destruction of the Juukan Gorge in Australia. Environmentalists, local population and some scientists and professors are against it, citing usage of large quantities of water and various acids and other chemicals in the production process, which will contaminate 2,000 ha (4,900 acres) of fertile, arable land, salinize the underground waters and pollute the rivers of Jadar and Drina. Other experts claim that there is no reason not to trust the company's claim that it will follow the highest anti-pollution measures, that waters are safe and that the land is not that fertile after all. The company itself stated it will employ a new, experimental process which prevents pollution and which was tested 2,000 times in Australia.

As of November 2021, construction of a mine has not begun. Amidst the growing opposition, Rio Tinto's Serbian branch "Rio Sava Exploration" announced that construction of the mine will begin in 2022, to be finished in 2026. The company claimed it already invested $250 million in the project, with additional $200 million planned for 2021. However, on 20 January 2022 Serbian prime minister Ana Brnabić announced the cancellation of the project, after mass protests organised by ecological organisations in Serbia.

== Kryptonite ==
Jadarite's chemical formula is similar but not identical to the formula ("sodium lithium boron silicate hydroxide with fluorine") invented for the fictional substance kryptonite in the 2006 film Superman Returns. This coincidence attracted mass-media attention in 2007, shortly after jadarite's discovery.

The new mineral, unlike the fictional material in the movie, does not contain fluorine and does not have a green glow.
