= Hum, Foča =

Hum
- Village
- Interactive map of Hum
- Location within Bosnia and Herzegovina
- Coordinates: 43°21′12″N 18°50′23″E
- Country: Bosnia and Herzegovina
- Entity: Republika Srpska
- Municipality: Foča
- Time zone: UTC+1 (CET)
  - Summer (DST): UTC+2 (CEST)

Hum (Serbian Cyrillic: Хум) is a village and a border crossing between Bosnia and Montenegro, under the eponymous mountain at the right bank of the Tara river, in Bosnia and Herzegovina, the municipality of Foča, Republika Srpska.
