= Jadar (region) =

Geographical subregion of Podrinje, Serbia

Coordinates: 44.5333°N 19.4167°E

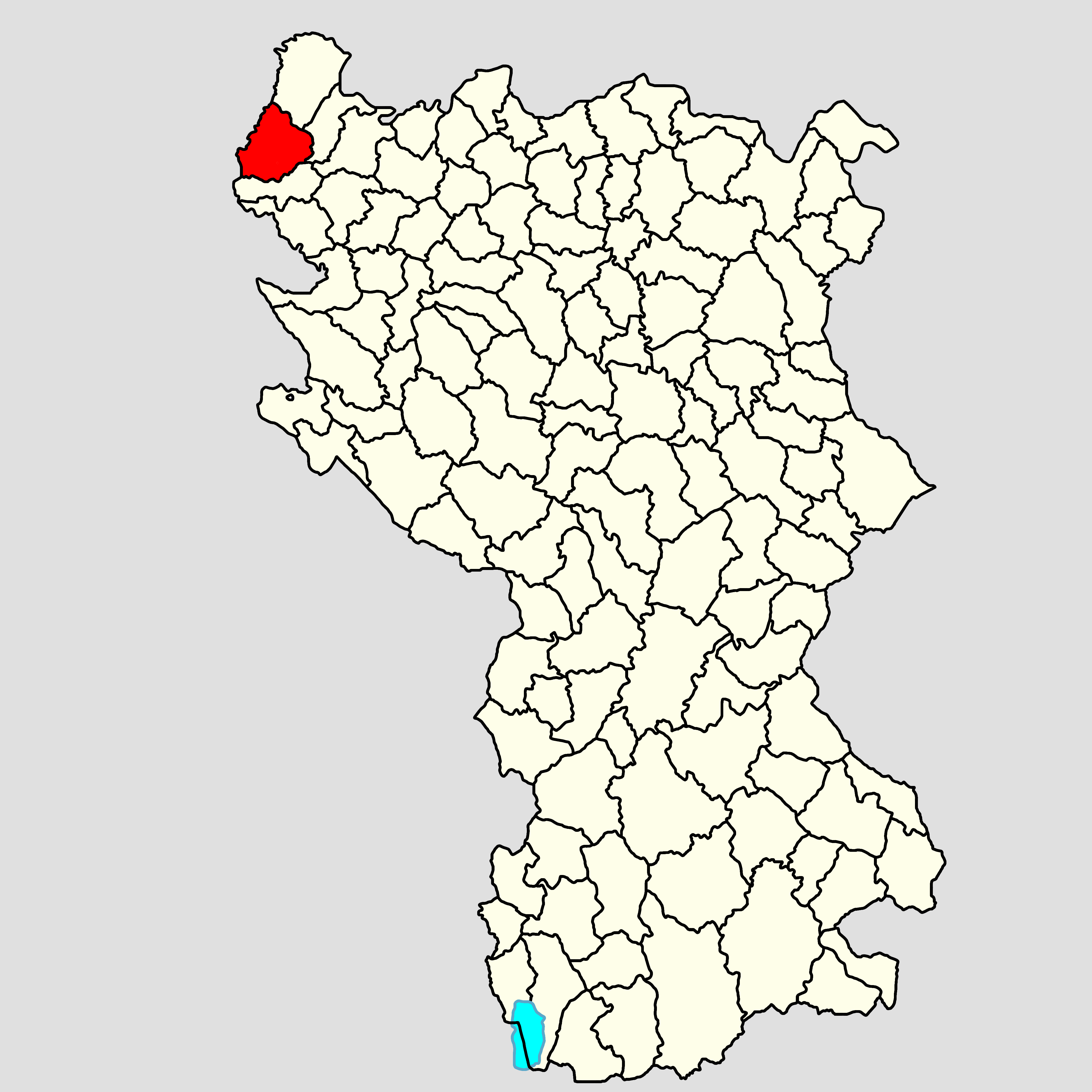
Srez of Jadar in the Kingdom of Serbia

The Jadar (Serbian Cyrillic: Јадар, pronounced [jǎːdar]) region is located in western Serbia. It is divided in two areas: Upper Jadar (around Osečina) and Lower Jadar (to the east of the town of Loznica).

The region is located in the Jadar Valley, bordered by the mountains of Vlašić, Cer, Gučevo and Sokolska planina. Lower Jadar is a low, agricultural area, while the Upper Jadar was an important mining region (antimony mines of Zavlaka and Bela Crkva).

In 1914, during World War I, a major battle between the Austro-Hungarian and Serbian armies took place in the area. The Serbian army defeated the Austro-Hungarian forces in what became known as the Battle of Cer, the first Allied victory of World War I. The battle is commemorated in Marš na Drinu, a march sometimes regarded as an unofficial alternative to the Serbian national anthem.

A new lithium mineral was discovered in Jadar in 2004, and named jadarite after the region. It is an economically attractive lithium ore, but Serbian environmentalists have opposed its mining and held mass protests in 2021 against it.

== See also ==
- List of regions of Serbia

== Sources ==
- Tomić, Persida (ed.). "Јадар". Гласник Етнографског музеја у Београду књ. 27. Etnografski muzej u Beogradu.
