= Karaklajić =

Origin
- Language: Serbian
- Meaning: kara (black) + klaja (crippled)

Other names
- Variant form: Karaklaja

Karaklajić (Serbian Cyrillic: Караклајић) is a Serbian surname, derived from the Turkish adjective kara, meaning "black", and the nickname "Klaja" from the Serbo-Croatian word kljast, meaning "crippled". The surname was historically found in the Sokol nahija villages of Zaovine, Rastište, Perućac and Brasina. The Zaovine Karaklajići migrated from Bijelo Polje, and earlier from Kuči; the Rastište Karaklajići were from Zaovine. It is today found in Šarenik as well. It is related to the surname Karaklaja which was derived directly from the nickname; hajduk Ivo Matović from Ivanjica used it (1868), though it was found earlier as a surname in the village of Majdan (1825) and in Užice (1866)

It may refer to:

- Nikola Karaklajić (born 1995), Serbian footballer
- Nikola Karaklajić (born 1926), chess master and radio personality
- Dejan Karaklajić (born 1946), Serbian television and film director
- Đorđe Karaklajić
- Radmila Karaklajić, singer
