= Mramorje =

Medieval necropolis in Perućac, Serbia

- Мраморје (Serbian)
- Bagruša / Багруша
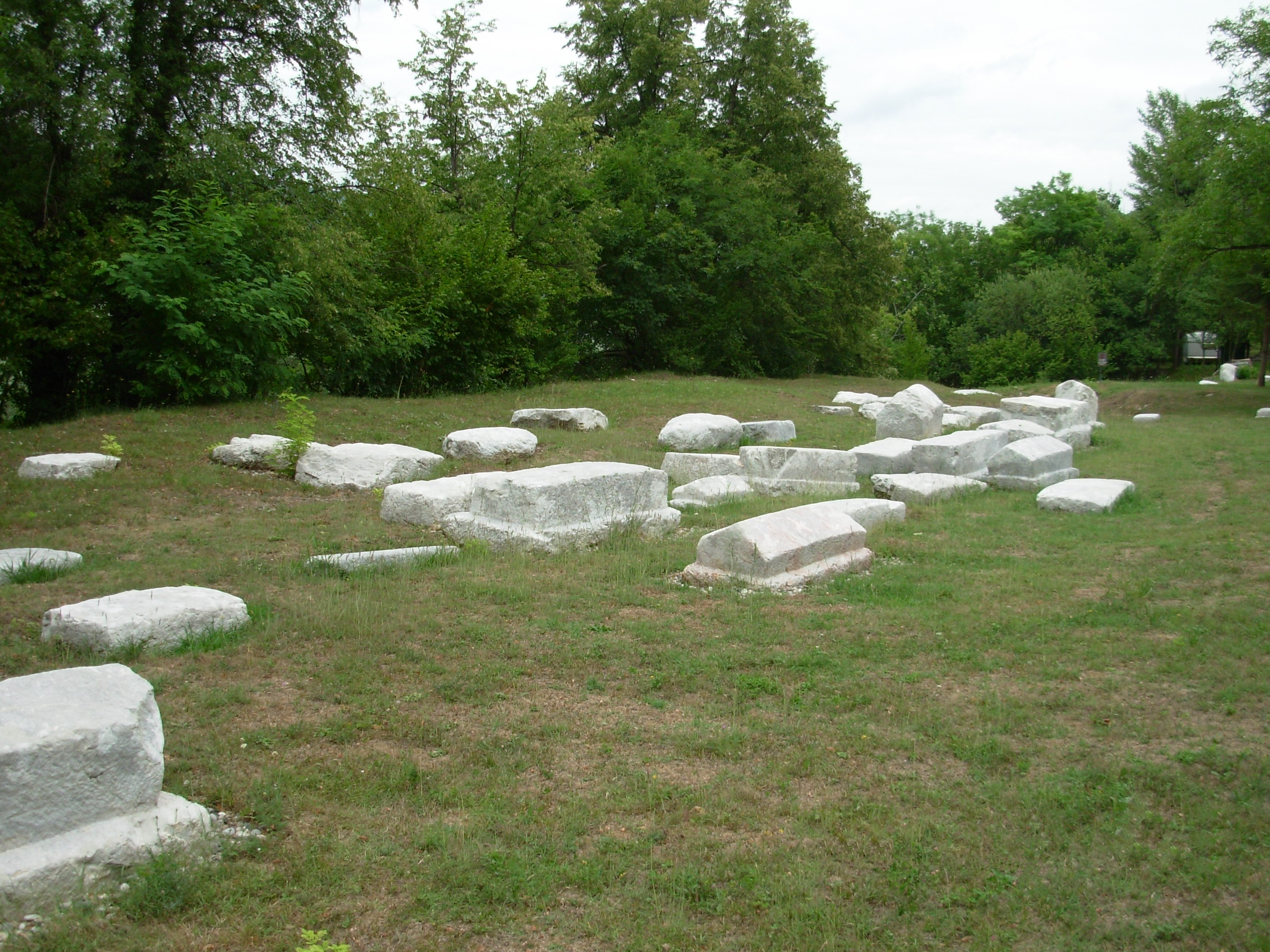
- Mramorje stećak and tombstone necropolis

- Location within Serbia
- 43°57′28″N 19°25′48″E
- Type: Tombstone and Stećak necropolis
- Cultures: Medieval Bosnia
- Location: Perućac
- Region: Bajina Bašta municipality

History
- Built: 14th century

Site notes
- Material: limestone blocks
- Condition: Ruined
- Owner: Republic of Serbia
- Public access: Yes

UNESCO World Heritage Site
- Type: Cultural
- Criteria: iii, vi
- Designated: 2016 (40th session)
- Part of: Stećci Medieval Tombstones Graveyards
- Reference no.: 1504
- Region: Europe and North America

Cultural Heritage of Serbia
- Official name: Mramorje
- Type: Archeological Site of Exceptional Importance
- Designated: 25 September 1968
- Reference no.: AN 26

Mramorje (Serbian Cyrillic: Мраморје) or Bagruša (Багруша) is a medieval necropolis, located in Perućac, Serbia, and is among the best preserved necropoli of the region. The necropolis was built in the 14th century, and extends between the Drina river and the main road that follows its course, at the entrance of the settlement. The site is protected by the Republic of Serbia, as a Monument of Culture of Exceptional Importance, but is nevertheless threatened by the Drina river on one side and the continued expanding of the town of Perućac, on the other. Stećaks was inscribed as a UNESCO World Heritage Site in 2016, of which 3 sites are located in Serbia, Mramorje being one of them.

== The Necropolis ==
The Necropolis, with about 200 tombstones made of solid limestone, was established in the fourteenth century. The largest found specimens of tombstones in the necropolis reach a length of 2 metres (6.6 ft), and a width and height of nearly 1 metre (3.3 ft). Earlier sources record a number of 122 monuments, while according to recent data, there are 93 as follows: 46 panel, 18 slemenjak with stand, 10 slemenjak without stand, 7 sarcophagus with stand, 10 sarcophagus without base, and 2 amorphous samples. Over time, some of the tombstones were moved, others have sunken into the ground, while several items were transferred to museums (two tombstones with no decorations are in the collection of the Ethnographic Museum in Belgrade, and one is in the National Museum in Užice).

Tombstones in the necropolis are arranged in regular rows, and also tend to have an east–west orientation. No inscriptions can be read on the tombstones, however a number of them are fine-processed, very few of them are decorated, and there are a few recorded motifs (including circles, the moon, and sword and shield designs).

== See also ==
- Stećak
- Perućac Lake
- Monuments of Culture of Exceptional Importance
