= Dobrotin =

Dobrotin may refer to:

- Dobrotin (Bajina Bašta), a village in Bajina Bašta, Serbia
- Dobrotin (Leskovac), a village in Leskovac, Serbia
