= Sijerač =

- Village (Selo)
- Location within Serbia
- Coordinates: 44°05′40″N 19°38′54″E
- Country: Serbia
- District: Šumadija
- Municipality: Bajina Bašta

Population (2002)
  - Total: 201
- Time zone: UTC+1 (CET)
  - Summer (DST): UTC+2 (CEST)

Sijerač (Serbian Cyrillic: Сијерач) is a village in the municipality of Bajina Bašta, Serbia. According to the 2002 census, the village has a population of 201 people.
