= Drina Regatta =

Annual sporting event in Serbia

Drina Regatta Дринска Регата
- Official logo
- Status: Active
- Genre: Festival
- Dates: 5 days, third week of July
- Frequency: Annually
- Location: Drina River
- Country: Serbia
- Inaugurated: 1994; 32 years ago
- Attendance: 20,000 (2017)
- Organiser: S.T.C. "Bajina Bašta"; Municipality of Bajina Bašta
- Website: regata.rs

The Drina Regatta (Serbian Cyrillic: Дринска Регата) is a tourist and recreational regatta event held on the Drina River.

It is active since 1994 and is organised by S.T.C. "Bajina Bašta" and the municipality of Bajina Bašta for recreation in wooden rafts. The regatta is the most visited event in Western Serbia and central summer event on the water in the region.

== Regatta and festivals ==
Day one of the festival features a swimming competition and fish soup competition near the small river of Vrelo in Perućac. The following day includes ‘Competition Regatta’ itself, which goes from Perućac to Bajina Bašta and dives from the Drina bridge which connects Bajina Bašta and Skelani in Bosnia and Herzegovina.

The third day is reserved for a major event and fun - recreational downhill, which involved hundreds of vessels and crew, with the trumpet, floating bar, music raft, barbecue and other specialties of the local.

At the plateau of the confluence of the Rača into the Drina, there is a music event held named ‘Most-fest’ (Bridge-Fest), and at the city square – Health and Recreation Fair.

The three-day regatta accompanied by concerts and other events, attracts over 100,000 visitors from within the country and abroad.

The course of the regatta is 25 km (16 mi) long, stretching between Perućac and Rogačica, and lasts for some three and a half hours. Festivities surrounding the regatta were later extended to 5 days. The 24th Regatta, held in July 2017, was the most attended: over 1,500 vessels with 20,000 people on the boats and 120,000 visitors in total. Most of the visitors are domestic, but tourists from distant countries, like Russia, Israel, China, United States or Australia also visit.

Impact on local economy is huge. In 5 days, retail sales income in Perućac is higher than in the rest 360 days of the year combined. The regatta, which is the most attended tourist event in western Serbia, was declared the best tourist event in Serbia in 2016, by the Ministry of Trade, Tourism and Telecommunications of Serbia.

== See also ==
- Drina river house
