= Pilica =

Pilica may refer to:

- Pilica (river) in south-central Poland
- Pilica (Bajina Bašta), a village in the municipality of Bajina Bašta, Serbia
- Pilica, Masovian Voivodeship, a village in east-central Poland
- Gmina Pilica, an administrative district in Zawiercie County, Silesian Voivodeship, Poland
  - Pilica, Silesian Voivodeship, seat of the district
- Pilica (fly), a genus of robber flies
