= Aluga =

Coordinates: 43.947°N 19.361°E

Aluga Алуга
- Village (Selo)
- Interactive map of Aluga
- Country: Serbia
- District: Zlatibor
- Municipality: Bajina Bašta
- Elevation: 341 m (1,119 ft)

Population (2002)
  - Total: 0
- Time zone: UTC+1 (CET)

Aluga (Serbian Cyrillic: Алуга) is an abandoned village near Bajina Bašta, in Zlatibor District, Serbia.
