= Perućac Lake =

- Perućačko jezero (Serbo-Croatian); Перућачко језеро (Serbo-Croatian)
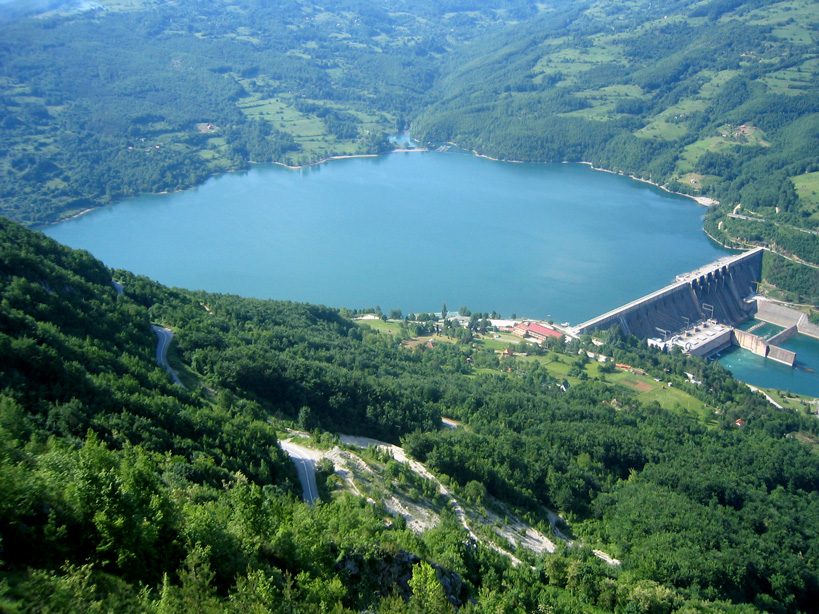
- Perućac and Bajina Bašta hydroelectric power plant

- Location within Bosnia and Herzegovina
- Location: between Višegrad & Bajina Bašta; 5/6 of the lake body is in Bosnia and Herzegovina, 1/6 in Serbia section 20 kilometers upstream from Perućac dam the lake constitute border between two countries
- Coordinates: 43.966320°N 19.410153°E
- Type: reservoir
- Etymology: Perućac
- Part of: Sava→Danube→Black Sea
- Primary inflows: Drina
- River sources: Drina, Rzav, Žepa
- Primary outflows: Drina
- Catchment area: 15.308 km^{2} (5.910 sq mi)
- Basin countries: Bosnia and Herzegovina; Serbia
- Built: 1961
- First flooded: November 27, 1966
- Max. length: 58 km (36 mi)
- Max. width: 45 to 1,000 m (148 to 3,281 ft)
- Surface area: 12.4 km^{2} (4.8 sq mi)
- Max. depth: 60 m (200 ft)
- Water volume: 340,000,000 m^{3} (1.2×10^{10} cu ft)
- Surface elevation: 290 m (950 ft)
- Settlements: Višegrad, Bajina Bašta
- References: For hydrographic values, see following:

Lake Perućac (Serbian: Језеро Перућац, romanized: Jezero Perućac) is an artificial lake on the Drina River, on the border between Bosnia and Herzegovina and Serbia. It was created in 1966 and occupies a natural bend of the river, which encircles the Tara mountain, between towns of Višegrad in Bosnia and Bajina Bašta in Serbia.

== History ==
The medieval necropolis of Mramorje is located near the lake. As one of the most important stećci complex in Serbia, it has been protected by the state as the Cultural Monument of Exceptional Importance. The necropolis originates rom the 1300s and the 1400s, and currently has 88 visible tombstones. All of them are plain, without ornaments, except for one which is decorated with a circle-shaped ornament. All stones are made of one white limestone block which weight 3 tons and more. They have been called mramorovi ("marble [blocks]"), hence the name of the locality. They are made in different shapes: slab, box, gable roof, slightly dressed rectangular stones, etc. Small scale exploration of the area was conducted in 2010 and the stone monuments were conserved in 2011.

The lake was created by damming the Drina River and harnessing its flow to power the Bajina Bašta hydroelectric power station. The lake was named after the village of Perućac, close to the dam.

The HPP Bajina Bašta, in Perućac village near Bajina Bašta, the second largest of its kind in Serbia, was built in 1966 as a result of a joint venture by Yugoslavian and Japanese companies. Between 1976 and 1983 a reversible pumping station was built, which was the second phase of the project. Excess electrical power produced during the rain season was used to pump water from the lake to hilltop of the Tara mountain, some 600 metres above. To hold this water and serve as the reversible reservoir for the PS HPP Bajina Bašta plant, an artificial Zaovine Lake was created up in the mountains by damming the Beli Rzav river.

During the summer days, Lake Perućac is the place where many of the residents of the surrounding area and the town of Bajina Bašta come to sunbathe, swim and fish. In the early 1970s, the pontoon beach was placed on the lake, near the dam. Due to the safety concerns, it has been closed in 2021. The annual boating event, the Drina Regatta, is held on the lake.

Since the mid-2010s, construction of numerous privately owned structures along the lake, and on the Tara Mountain, within the national park, began. By 2020 there were several thousands of them, vast majority being built illegally, without proper permits or any documentation at all. The structures include houses, villas and floating barges with houses, with some covering several hundreds of square meters. The sewage system wasn't built so the waste spills directly into the streams and the lake itself, while floating garbage covered areas around the barges. As the municipal plan excludes existence of this type of structures, in 2015 removal of the barges was ordered. By 2018, out of 85, all but 5 were demolished or removed, either by the owners themselves (35) or by the municipality (45). However, by 2023 the number of illegal structures grew to 157.

The situation was described as "everyone is having a jurisdiction, and no one is having a jurisdiction". Only the management of the national park publicly and officially protested, but neither the state nor the municipal authorities reacted. The management gathered all paperwork needed for the demolition instead of the municipality, and handed over the papers so the municipality could act. The State Revisory Institute also ordered the municipality to remove all the structures, as per its own plan, by December 2022, while the state government dispatched RSD24 million (over €200,000), but the municipal authorities ignored everything.

In August 2010, it became the site of a forensic operation to retrieve the bodies of Bosniak victims of the 1992 Višegrad massacres. The lake was a location where the transported remains of Kosovo Albanians killed during the 1999 conflict were concealed.

== Geography and hydrography ==
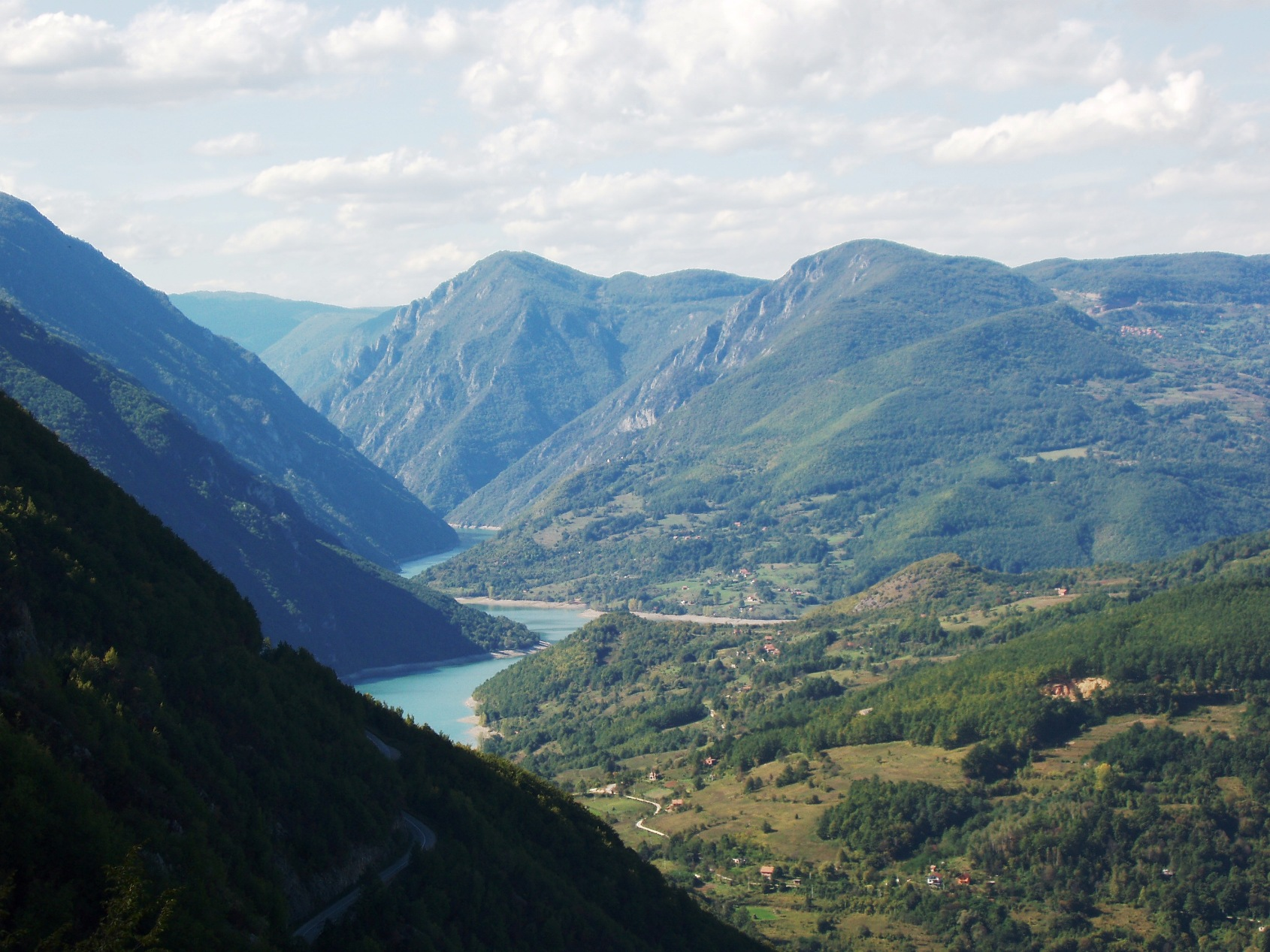
A view on Lake Perućac from Tara mountain

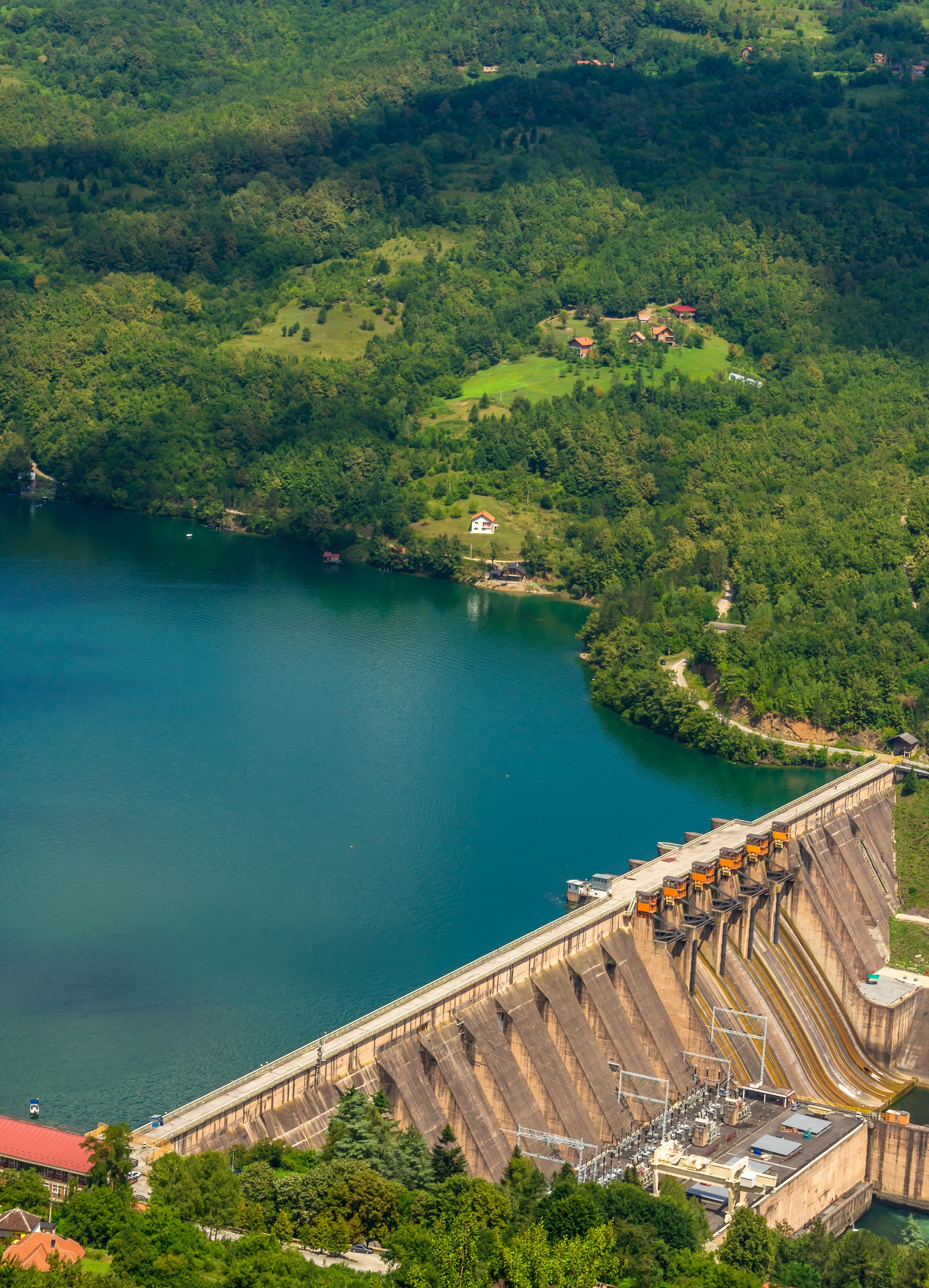
Perućac dam

The lake is situated at an altitude of 290 m (950 ft) and the majority of it, some 5/6 is within Bosnia and Herzegovina, while 1/6 in Serbia, as the border between the two countries takes the route of longitudinal axes of the Drina river at the section within the canyon where the Brusnička river enters the lake, some 20 km (12 mi) upstream from the dam and Peruća village. The lake occupies a natural bend of the river, between Višegrad and Bajina Bašta, which bypassing Tara mountain from left to right.

The dam of the hydro plant which created the lake is 93 m (305 ft) tall. The reservoir covers and area of 12.4 km^{2} (4.8 sq mi) with the volume of 340,000,000 m^{3} (1.2×10^{10} cu ft). It is 58 km (36 mi) long, 45 to 1,000 m (148 to 3,281 ft) wide and up to 60 to 80 m (200 to 260 ft) deep.

== Wildlife ==
Fish species living in the lake include wels catfish, huchen, common barbel, European chub, common nase, tench and cactus roach.

== Mass grave investigations ==
A mass grave containing 48 bodies and possibly more than 60 was discovered near the lake in 2001. The bodies were believed to be those of Kosovo Albanians killed by Serbian forces during the 1999 conflict, brought to the lake in a refrigerated lorry dumped there during NATO air raids.

The burial site was a gravel pit on the north bank of Derventa River, close to its confluence with Lake Perućac, 13 km from Bajina Bašta and 2 km from the village of Rastiste. It contained parts of a truck refrigerator container that was used to bring the bodies. The bones and clothing retrieved showed evidence of burning.

Of 48 bodies examined by the Institute of Pathology and Forensic Medicine of Belgrade Military Hospital, 38 were male, one was female, and the sex of nine could not be established. Dressed in civilian clothing, age of the victims ranged from mid-adolescence to elderly. There was considerable ballistic evidence including classic execution style gunshot wounds to the head in many cases. They had been buried for about two years and the condition of the remains indicated that they had spent some time in the water. Identity documents belonging to two persons from Djakovica were found with the exhumed bodies.

Dragan Karleuša, head of the Serbian police organized crime unit responsible for investigating the grave, said that in April 1999 a freezer truck containing between 50 and 60 corpses was pushed into the lake. Seven corpses immediately floated back to the surface and were removed. Two days later a container holding between 50 and 60 bodies also came to the surface. The bodies were placed in a mass grave. Karleuša said the event was covered up despite the fact that numerous residents had witnessed the removal of the bodies from the reservoir.

An anonymous reservist told Danas, a Belgrade daily newspaper, that he saw a freezer truck being pushed into the lake, after the water level had been lowered. A rocket had been fired into the truck to sink it but corpses started to emerge from the hole made by explosion. The bodies were buried near the village of Rastiste. The bodies that emerged two days later were buried in a separate grave, next to the first. The reservist said that the operation was characterized as a "state secret". The reservist was upset that local people were supposed to allow their children to swim in the lake while officials remained silent about the bodies concealed there. A senior police officer reported that witnesses to the incident had first been threatened and were then paid 20 German marks to remain silent.

The disposal of the bodies at Lake Perućac, done by Yugoslav Army soldiers under orders from their superiors, has been linked to the finding of two other submerged refrigerator trucks containing the bodies of Kosovo Albanians at Kladovo and Đerdap. It is assumed that at least ten and possibly dozens of truckloads of bodies were taken from Kosovo to Serbia to be dumped underwater or buried in mass graves. The investigation was set up under the authority of Sreten Lukić, the Serbian police director of public security, who served as the commander of police forces in Kosovo during the war.

During the trial of police general Vlastimir Đorđević, chief of the Public Security Department in the Serbian MUP, before the International Criminal Tribunal for the former Yugoslavia in Hague, Đorđe Kerić, former chief of the Užice SUP, gave evidence that in April 1999 he had informed Đorđević that a refrigerator truck containing dozens of bodies of Kosovo Albanians had been found in Lake Perućac after some of the bodies surfaced. Kerić had been told by the chief of the SUP Criminal Investigations Division that the bodies were those of civilians, men and women, from a sunken truck with no license plates. They were all heavily decomposed and Kerić was told they could not be identified. He claimed Đorđević had ordered him to bury the bodies near the lake without notifying local legal officials or carrying out the standard scene of crime investigation procedure. Đorđević's defence maintained that Kerić decided to carry out the burials himself, not on Đorđević's orders.

Police sources alleged that Đorđević had been in charge of removing the bodies from Kosovo and burying them at secret locations in Serbia as part of a "cleaning-up operation" in Kosovo ordered by Slobodan Milošević in March 1999 at a meeting with Interior Minister, Vlajko Stojiljković, secret police chief Radomir Marković, and Đorđević.

During the 2010 investigation of the Višegrad massacres remains of engine and chassis of the truck were found. Serbian War Crimes Prosecutor Vladimir Vukcević said that the investigation was ongoing.

== See also ==
- Lakes of Bosnia and Herzegovina
- List of lakes of Serbia
