= Jagoštica =

Jagoštica Јагоштица
- Village (Selo)
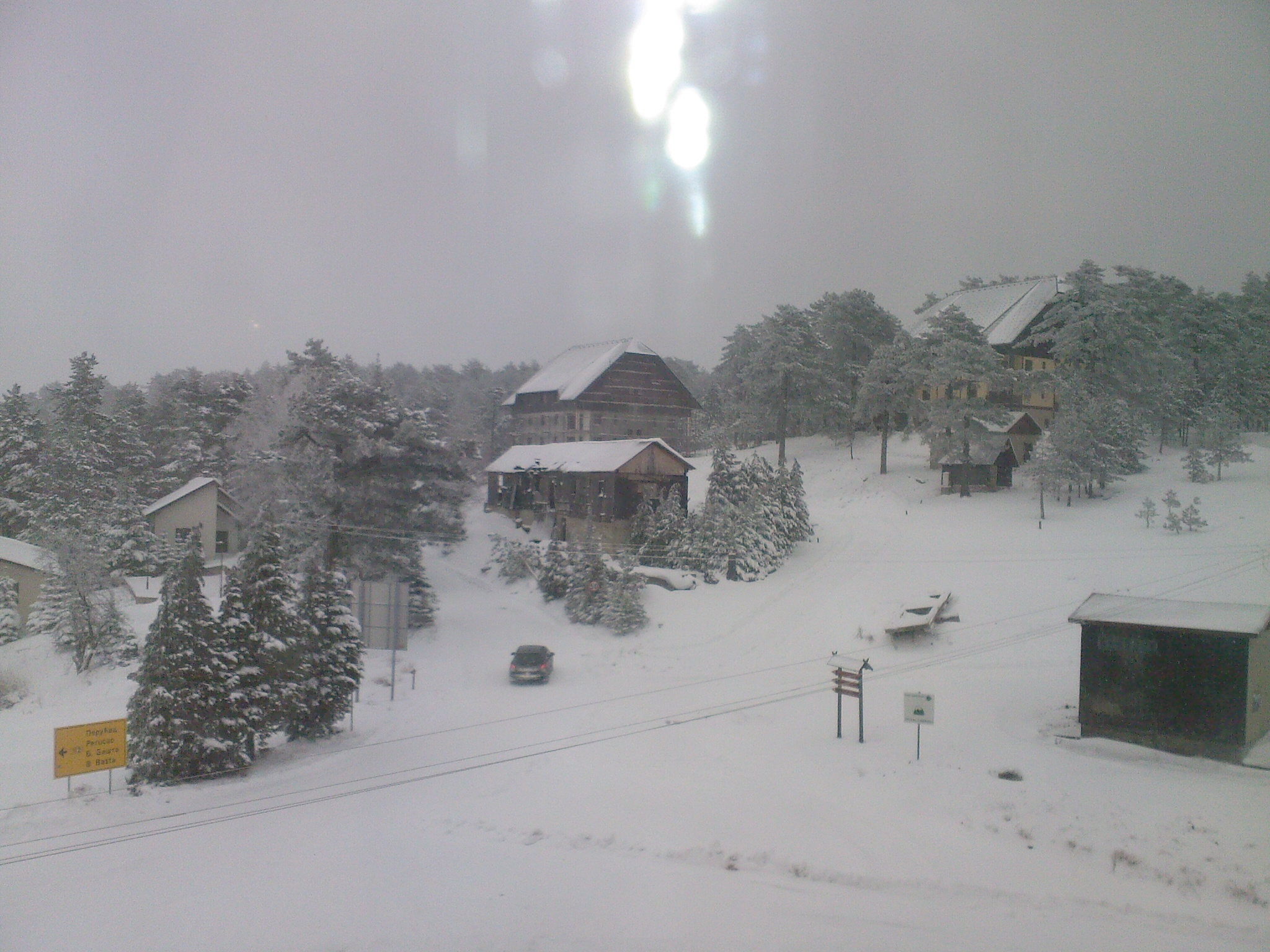
- Jagoštica in the winter

- Location within Serbia
- Coordinates: 43°57′N 19°16′E
- Country: Serbia
- District: Zlatibor
- Municipality: Bajina Bašta

Area
  - Total: 43.15 km^{2} (16.66 sq mi)
- Elevation: 994 m (3,261 ft)

Population (2022)
  - Total: 59
  - Density: 1.4/km^{2} (3.5/sq mi)
- Time zone: UTC+1 (CET)
  - Summer (DST): UTC+2 (CEST)

Jagoštica (Serbian Cyrillic: Јагоштица) is a village located in the municipality of Bajina Bašta, western Serbia. As of the 2022 census census, it has a population of 59 inhabitants.
