= Beserovina =

- Village (Selo)
- Location within Serbia
- Coordinates: 43°57′N 19°28′E
- Country: Serbia
- District: Šumadija
- Municipality: Bajina Bašta
- Time zone: UTC+1 (CET)
  - Summer (DST): UTC+2 (CEST)

Beserovina (Serbian Cyrillic: Басеровина) is a village in the municipality of Bajina Bašta, Serbia. According to the 2002 census, the village has a population of 213 people.
