= Zlodol =

- Village (Selo)
- Location within Serbia
- Coordinates: 43°55′N 19°41′E
- Country: Serbia
- District: Šumadija
- Municipality: Bajina Bašta

Population (2002)
  - Total: 419
- Time zone: UTC+1 (CET)
  - Summer (DST): UTC+2 (CEST)

Zlodol (Serbian Cyrillic: Злодол) is a village in the municipality of Bajina Bašta, Serbia. At the time of the 2002 census, the village had a population of 419 people.
