= Radio Bajina Bašta =

Radio Bajina Bašta is a radio station in Bajina Bašta, Western Serbia. It started broadcasting on May 15, 1992, during the war in Bosnia, only a few hundred meters west of the radio station.

== History ==
Although the war never reached Serbian soil, the border regions received refugees from both sides of the conflict. Bajina Bašta was inundated with Muslims and Serbs who had been expelled from their homes in Bosnia. Employees of the radio station began collecting and broadcasting information that was different from the propaganda broadcast by Serbian and Bosnian National Television. The radio station attempted to disseminate factual information and use language of understanding, goodwill and tolerance, in contrast to the antagonistic messages being broadcast by some stations.

Political extremists started criticizing and threatening the radio station, and soon Radio Bajina Bašta was struggling to survive. The first independent radio station from Belgrade, B92, offered to help, followed by the Soros Foundation, Studio B, UNESCO, IFJ/FIEJ and others, ensuring Radio Bajina Bašta could stay on the air.

Bajina Bašta radio is part of a privately owned media company which consists of TV Bajina Bašta and Bajinobaštanska Baština.

Bajina Bašta's radio signal reaches the whole of western Serbia and the eastern part of Bosnia. The station broadcasts 24 hours of news, music and other entertainment programs. It has received a number of international awards including the Radio Free Europe/Radio Liberty award for the best war coverage during the NATO bombing of Yugoslavia and the Jug Grizelj Award for "the highest achievements in investigative journalism in the service of eliminating borders and developing friendship among nations", as well as several local awards.
