= Drina river house =

Architectural curiosity and tourist attraction

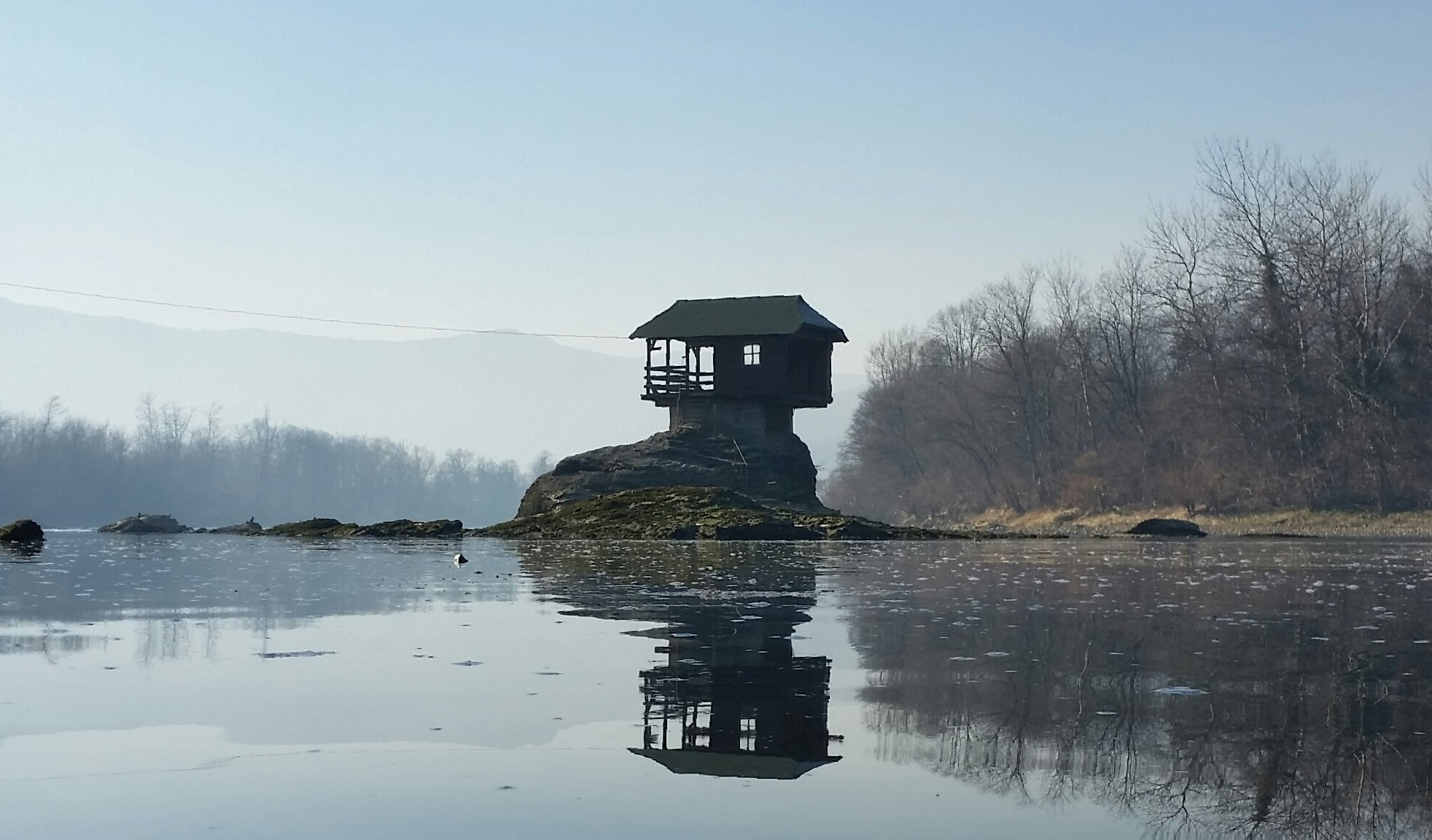

Drina river house (Serbian Cyrillic: Кућица на Дрини, Kućica na Drini) is a wooden, cabin-like house on the rock in the middle of the Drina river, near the town of Bajina Bašta in western Serbia. The original object was built in 1968 by a group of swimmers who needed a shelter. Until 2019, it was destroyed 7 times during the high water level in the river, but was rebuilt every time.

== Location ==
The house is located on the north-eastern slopes of the Tara, between Bajina Bašta in Serbia, and Liješće in Bosnia and Herzegovina. It is 2 km (1.2 mi) away upstream from downtown Bajina Bašta.

== History ==
=== Origin ===
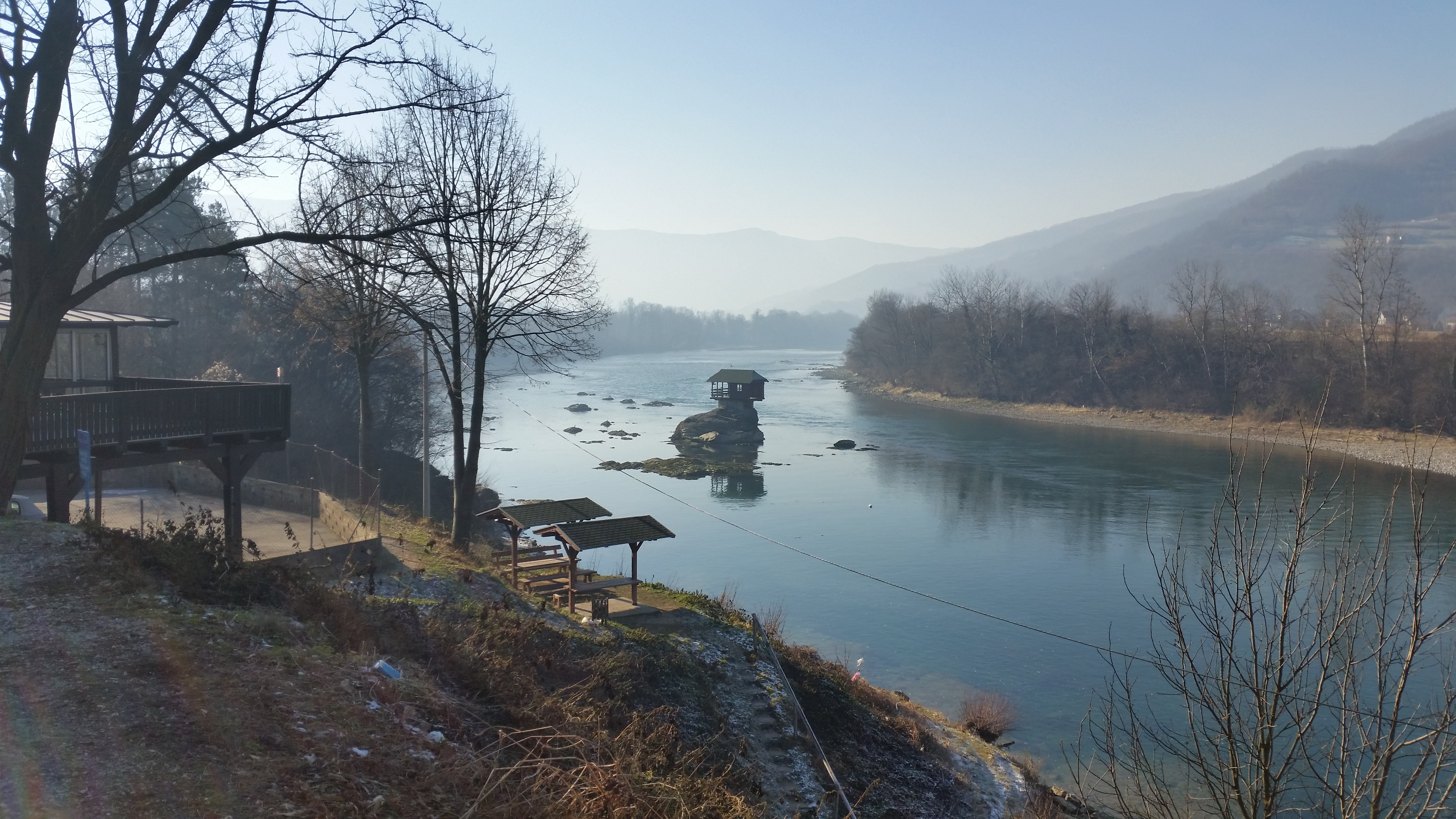

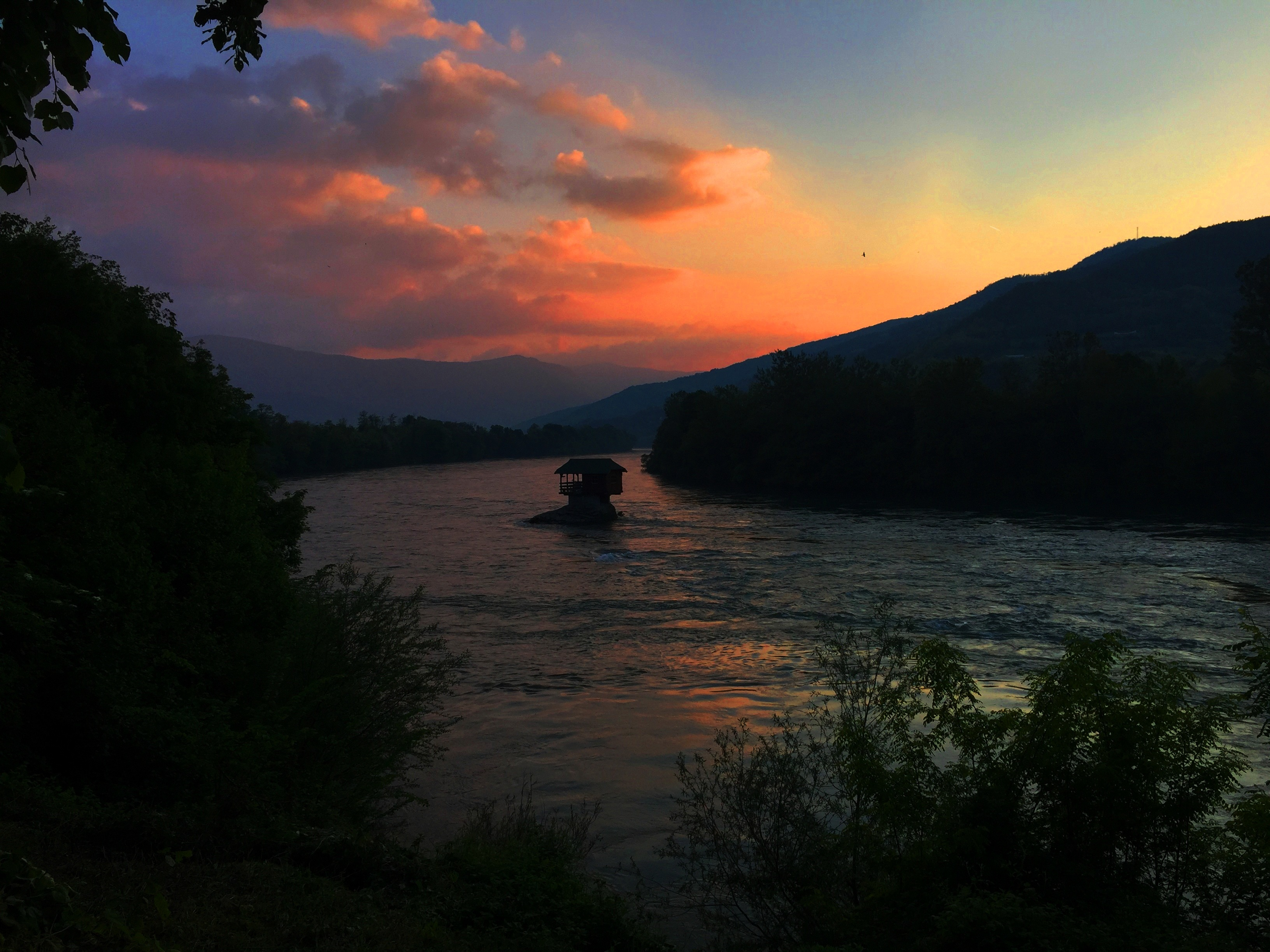

The isolated rock on which the house is built is almost right in the middle of the river, close to the modern border between Serbia and Bosnia and Herzegovina. According to local legends, Medieval hero Kraljević Marko was travelling through the area and wanted to cross the river and reach the other side. However, he didn’t want his horse Šarac to step into the deep water. So Kraljević Marko climbed the Crvena Stena natural lookout in the vicinity and threw a large boulder into the Drina. Rolling boulder stopped in the center of the river, which allowed for Šarac to hop on it from one side and then to hop to the other side of the river, carrying Kraljević Marko on his back. Local population claims that even today the marks of Šarac’s hoofs are visible on the rock.

The rock has been used by swimmers as a resting place between either continuing to swim across to the other side, or back to the bank from which they came. However, during the summer, the rock would get scorching hot. In the summer of 1968, brothers Milija and Milan Mandić, with a group of their friends, decided to build a cabin or a hut on the rock. They decided to use the planks of wood brought by the river itself. In the end, they managed to erect a simple shelter. After the rainy season began later in the autumn, the Drina washed away the structure.

=== Later developments ===
In the summer of 1969, the local youth organized and built a cabin. Lighter materials, including planks, were transported directly to the rock by boats and kayaks, while the timber rafting was used for the heavier lumber logs. The caretaker of the house was one of the brothers, Milija Mandić (1952-2017). The house soon became a favorite gathering place for young people in Bajina Bašta and earned a reputation of a romantic getaway. As the later incarnations were built to be more resilient, they would usually be washed away by the river in one piece. Mandić and his fellow kayakers would then chase the cabin to catch it and drag it back to the rock. Sometimes it would take few dozens of kilometers to catch it.

The house was destroyed for the fifth time in December 1999. It was reconstructed only in 2005, but was washed away again. The new one, with two concrete beams, was built instead, but was again destroyed in December 2010, for the seventh time. The present house was built in 2011.

== Popularity ==
The house started to gain prominence after the establishing of the Drina Regatta in 1994. The route of the regatta passes next to the house, so many non-local people became aware of its existence, as the regatta has up to 20,000 participants, including many from abroad.

The house became one of the most photographed objects in Serbia. A photo of it was chosen as one of the Photos of the Month of ‘’National Geographic’’ in August 2012. ‘’Business Insider’’ named it among 16 “wackiest” houses, while numerous world magazines wrote stories about it.

== See also ==
- Drina
- Drina Regatta
