= Vrelo (river) =

Vrelo Godina
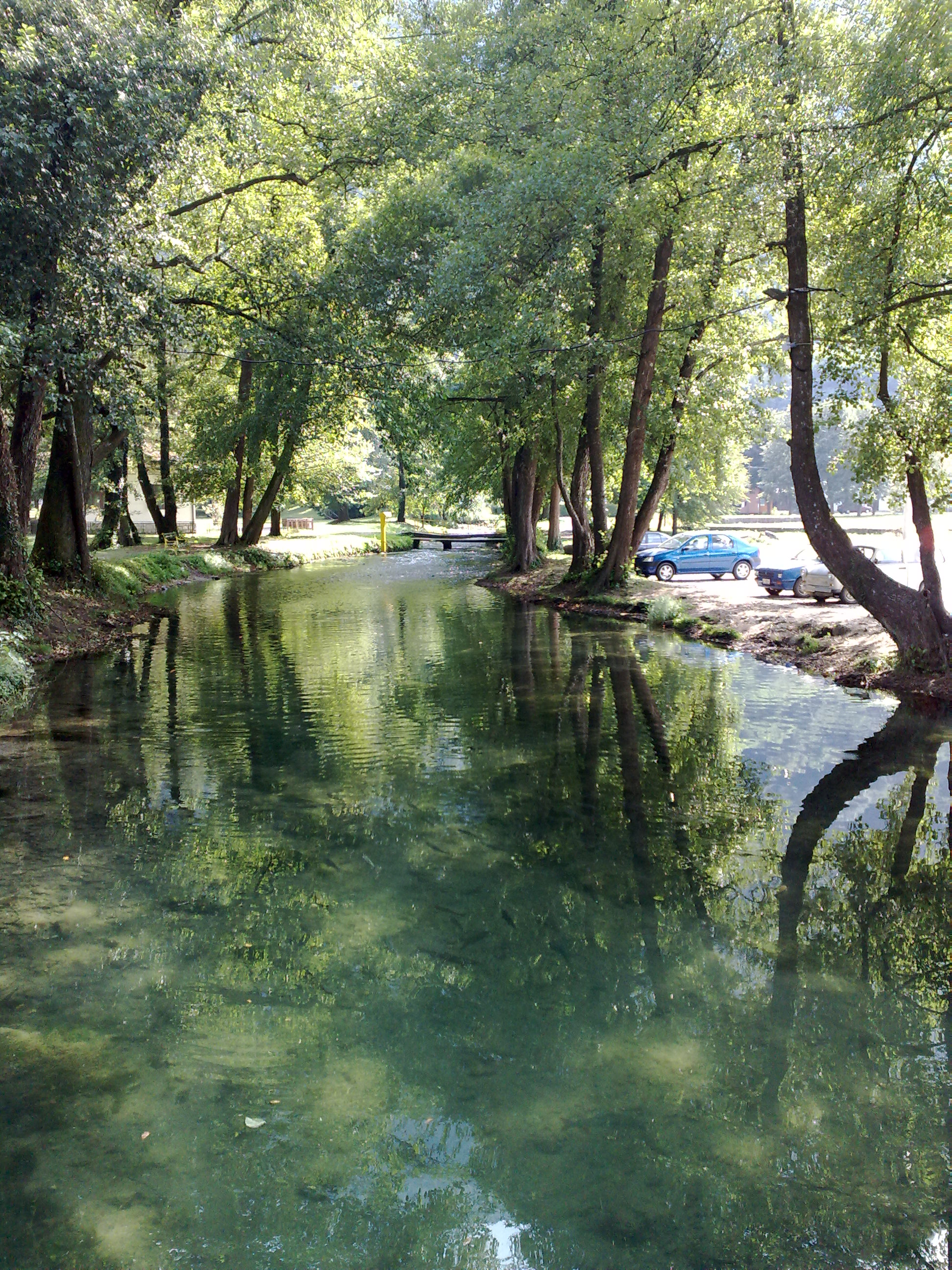
- The Vrelo in Perućac

Location
- Country: Serbia

Physical characteristics
- Source
  - location: Karst spring
  - elevation: 234 m (768 ft)
- Mouth
  - location: Drina, at the Serbian-Bosnian border
  - coordinates: 43.9583°N 19.4272°E
- Length: 365 m (1,198 ft)

Basin features
- Progression: Drina→ Sava→ Danube→ Black Sea

Vrelo (Serbian Cyrillic: Врело) is a right tributary of the river Drina in the settlement of Perućac, Bajina Bašta Municipality in Serbia. The river is only 365 meters long and is probably one of the shortest rivers in the world.

== Course ==
The stream springs out of a large rock. It forms a small waterfall and then flows mostly slowly, with crystal clear water. After it passes under the concrete bridge, it rapids over the natural obstacles made of rocks and tree roots. It fastens, starts to resound and foam, before it reached the waterfall and falls into the Drina.

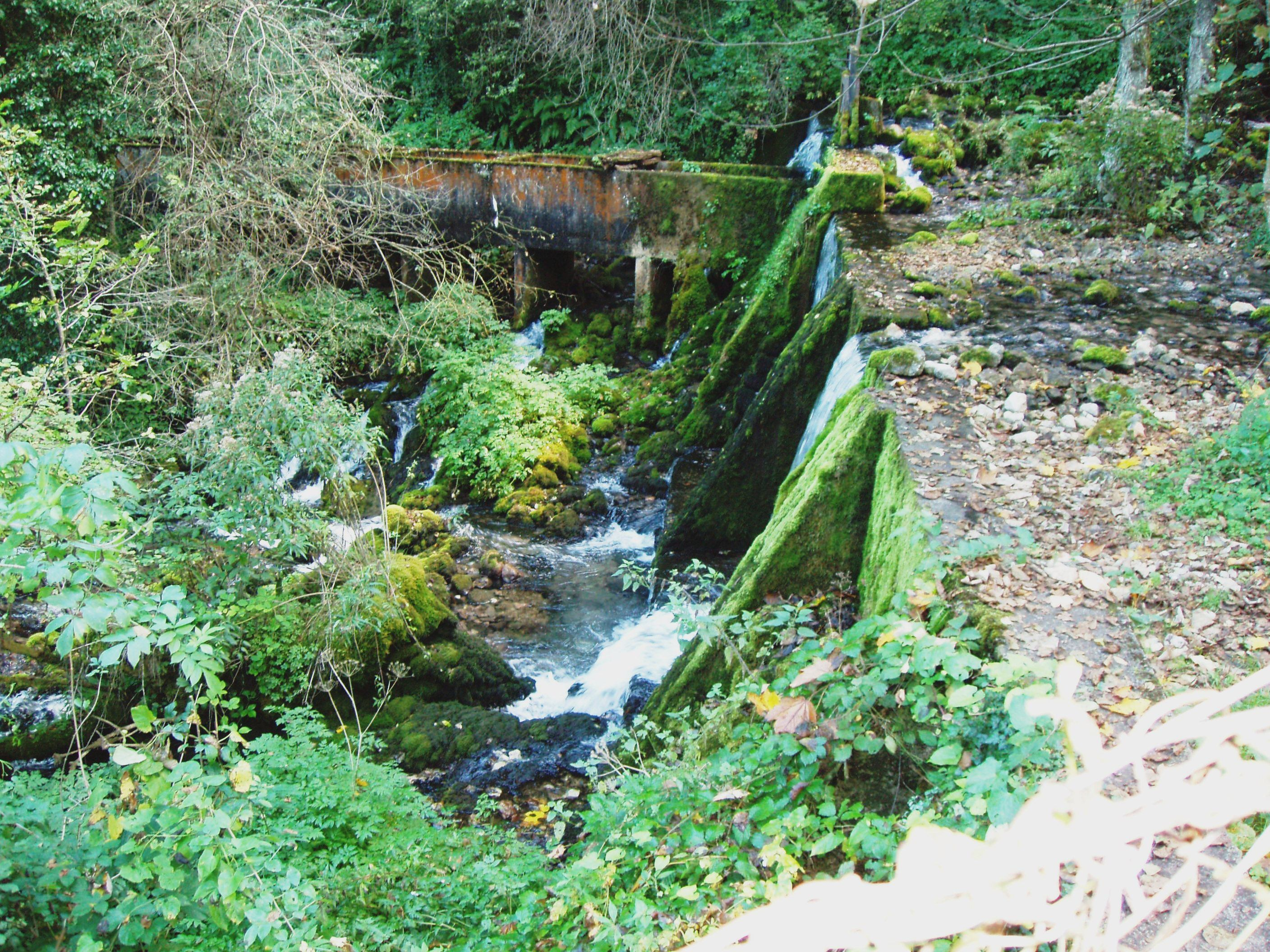
The confluence of the Vrelo River into the Drina River

== Characteristics ==
Due to its length (same number of meters as days per year), many call it the "Godina" (Serbian Cyrillic: Година, lit. 'year') and say it's one year long. The river has a strong spring and after its short course it flows into the Drina via a waterfall. Although short, the river has all the characteristics of major rivers – the great, powerful source from which water gushes whitish, a pond on the right bank, water mill on the left, a left tributary in the form of clear creek, a village on the left bank, two bridges.

There is a restaurant on the small plateau above the final waterfall.

== See also ==
- List of rivers of Serbia
