= Šarenik =

- Village
- Location within Serbia
- Coordinates: 43°36′39″N 20°04′03″E
- Country: Serbia
- District: Moravica District
- Municipality: Ivanjica

Area
  - Total: 30.44 km^{2} (11.75 sq mi)

Population (2011)
  - Total: 467
  - Density: 15.3/km^{2} (39.7/sq mi)
- Time zone: UTC+1 (CET)
  - Summer (DST): UTC+2 (CEST)

Šarenik is a village in the municipality of Ivanjica, Serbia. According to the 2011 census, the village has a population of 467 inhabitants.
