= National Obesity Observatory =

Publisher of British and Irish public health data

The National Obesity Observatory (NOO) was a publicly funded body that is part of a network of Public Health Observatories across Britain and Ireland. It published data, information, and intelligence related to obesity, overweight, and their underlying causes. NOO is now part of Public Health England who now carry out their work.

NOO worked closely with a wide range of organisations to assist policy makers and practitioners who were involved in understanding and tackling obesity at population level. It did this through analysing and interpreting research and data to produce reports and briefings. To support these activities it also produced analytical and data visualisation tools. These are used, for example, to map obesity and associated determinants at national, regional and local levels.

Members of NOO were instrumental in establishing the National Child Measurement Programme (NCMP). Analysis and interpretation of the NCMP dataset is a core element of NOO's work.

NOO is a member of the Association of Public Health Observatories.

== Standard evaluation framework ==
The Standard Evaluation Framework (SEF) for weight management interventions was published by the NOO in 2009. It comprises a guidance document in three parts: an introductory guide to evaluation; a table listing essential and desirable data to be collected; and a detailed description of each data item in the table.

The SEF is intended to help people to achieve and maintain a healthy weight. The aim of the SEF is to increase the number and quality of evaluations and this in turn will support the generation of evidence-based practice.

The SEF was developed following extensive consultation with a wide range of interested parties, including practitioners, academic experts, and representatives from public health observatories, regional public health groups, primary care trusts and other relevant organisations.

The SEF lists the minimum data necessary for a meaningful evaluation; alongside these it also lists a further set of desirable data that would enhance the evaluation. Supporting material explains the reasons behind these classifications and provides guidance on how to collect data. The SEF also provides basic guidance on how to conduct an evaluation for people with limited experience in this area.

The SEF can be used with a range of interventions including those conducted with individuals on a one-to-one basis or in groups, and in clinical and community settings. It is not intended for use with surgical and medicinal approaches to weight management, or in broader programmes that include changes to the built environment.

The SEF is very much a work in progress, and will itself be subject to an evaluation.
