= Perućac =

- Village (Selo)
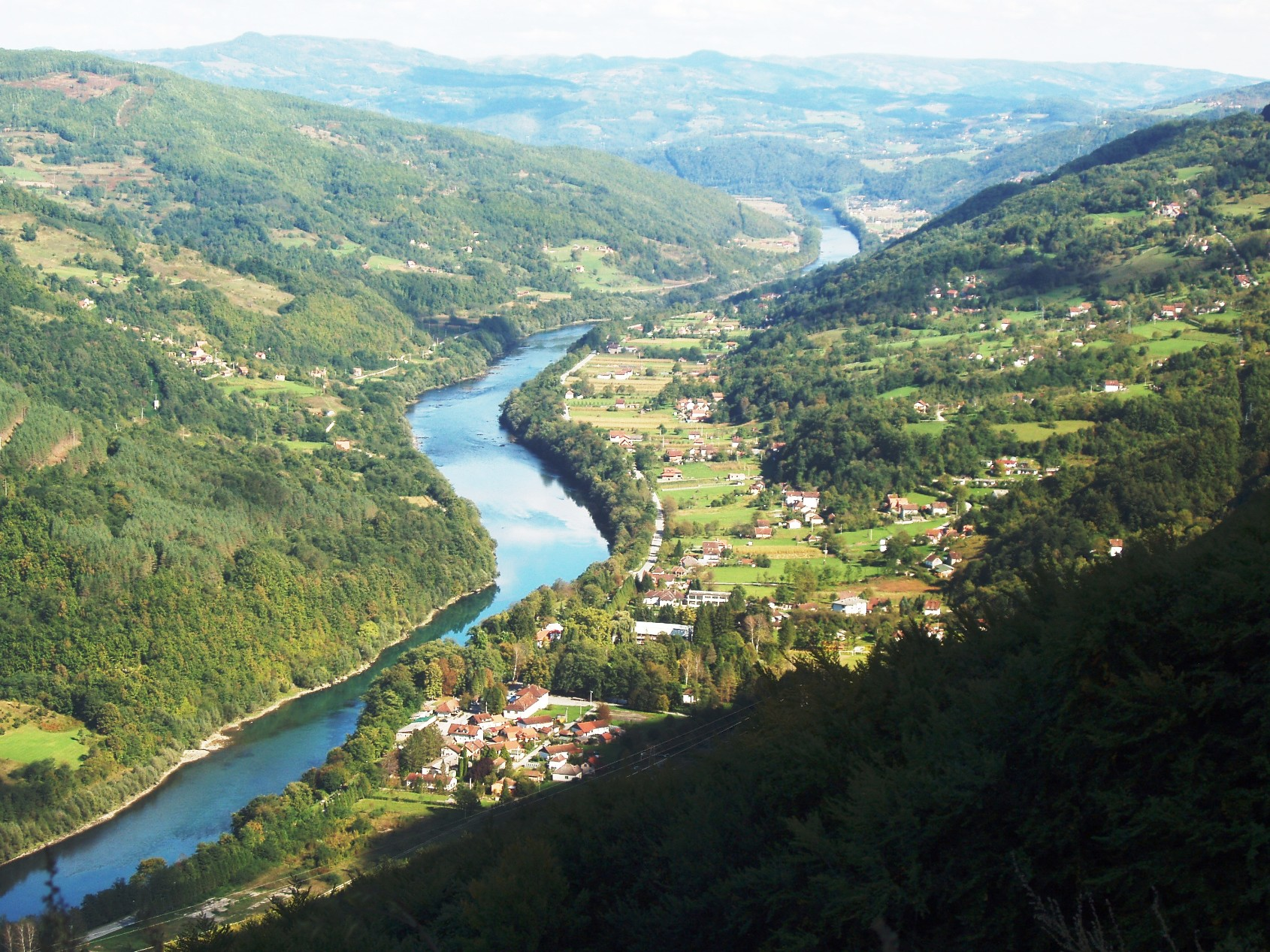
- A view to the village from the Tara mountain

- Location within Serbia
- Coordinates: 43°57′14″N 19°25′16″E
- Country: Serbia
- District: Zlatibor
- Municipality: Bajina Bašta

Population (2011)
  - Total: 530
- Time zone: UTC+1 (CET)
  - Summer (DST): UTC+2 (CEST)

Perućac (Serbian Cyrillic: Перућац) is a village in western Serbia, in the municipality of Bajina Bašta. It is situated at the right bank of the 346 km-long Drina River, which constitutes the natural border between Serbia and Bosnia and Herzegovina. According to the 2011 Census, the village has 530 residents.

Perućac gave name to the artificial Perućac Lake, supplying the Bajina Bašta hydro-electric power plant, built in 1966 in vicinity of the village.

Perućac features what is reputedly Serbia's smallest river — the Vrelo. It is known as the "year-long river", due to its length — 365 m — from its source to its end, with the length in metres corresponding to the number of days in a year. The Vrelo flows into the Drina just a few hundred metres downstream the dam.

During the summer days, Lake Perućac is the place where many of the residents of the surrounding area and the town of Bajina Bašta come to sunbathe, swim and fish. Perućac is also where the 56 km-long canyon of the River Drina begins.

== See also ==
- Perućac Lake
