= Bajina Bašta =

Bajina Bašta Бајина Башта (Serbian)
- Town and municipality
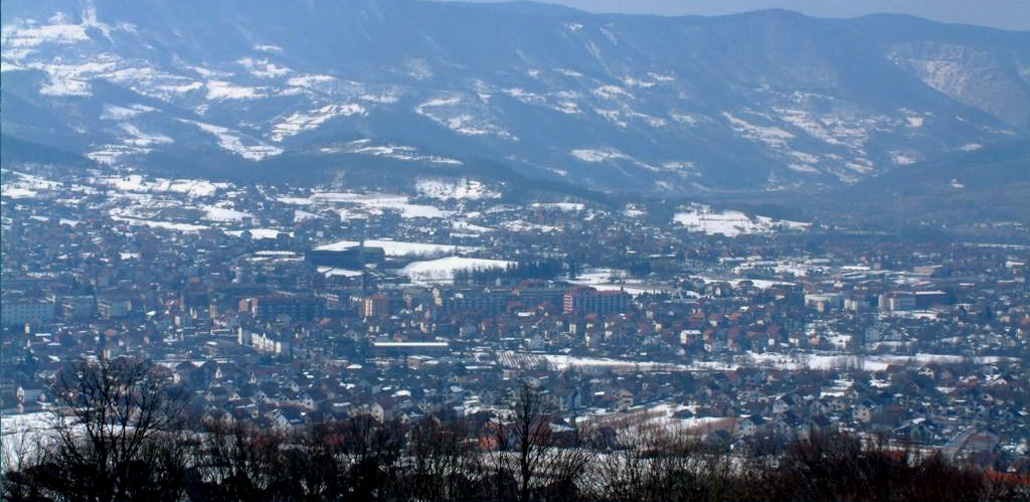
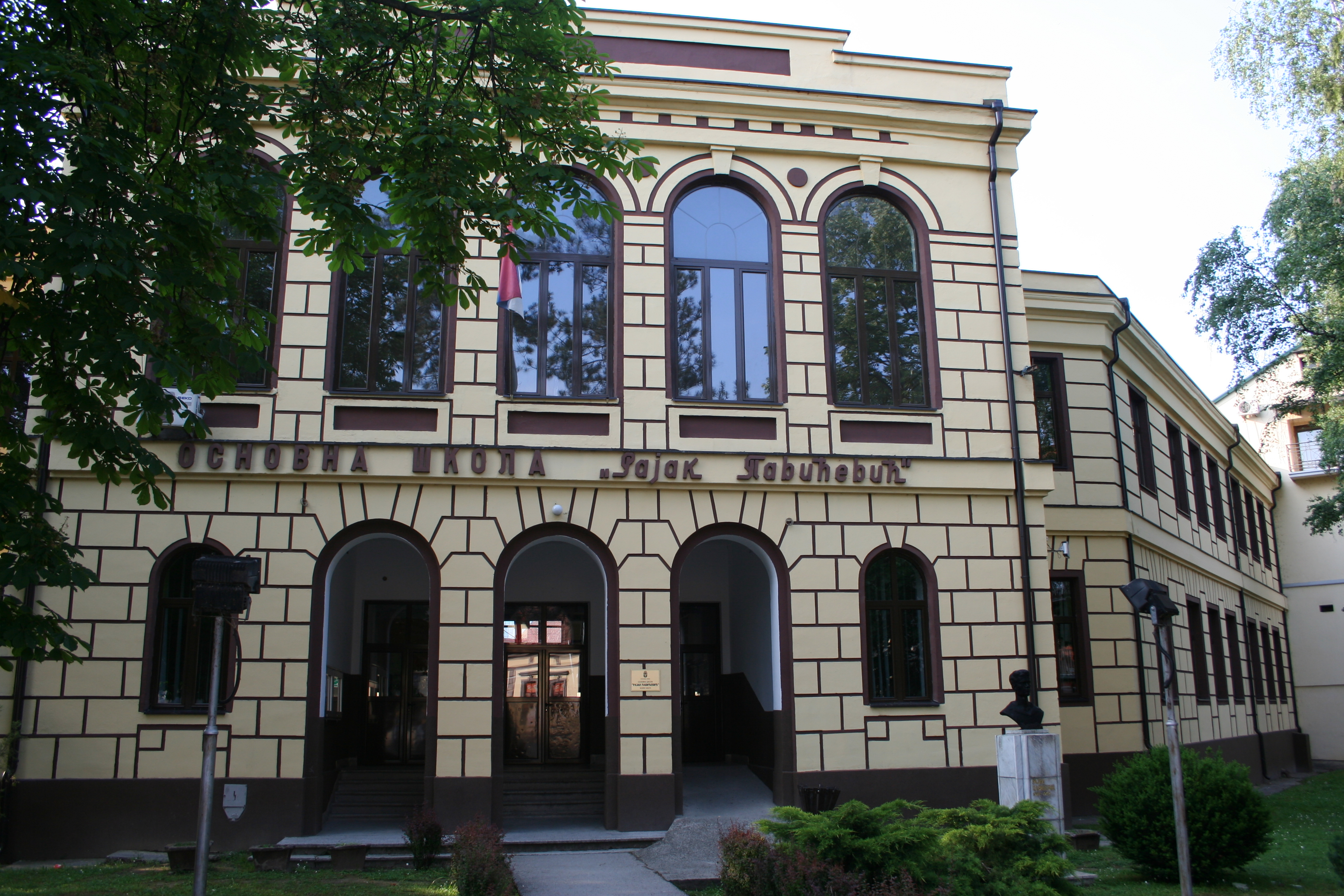
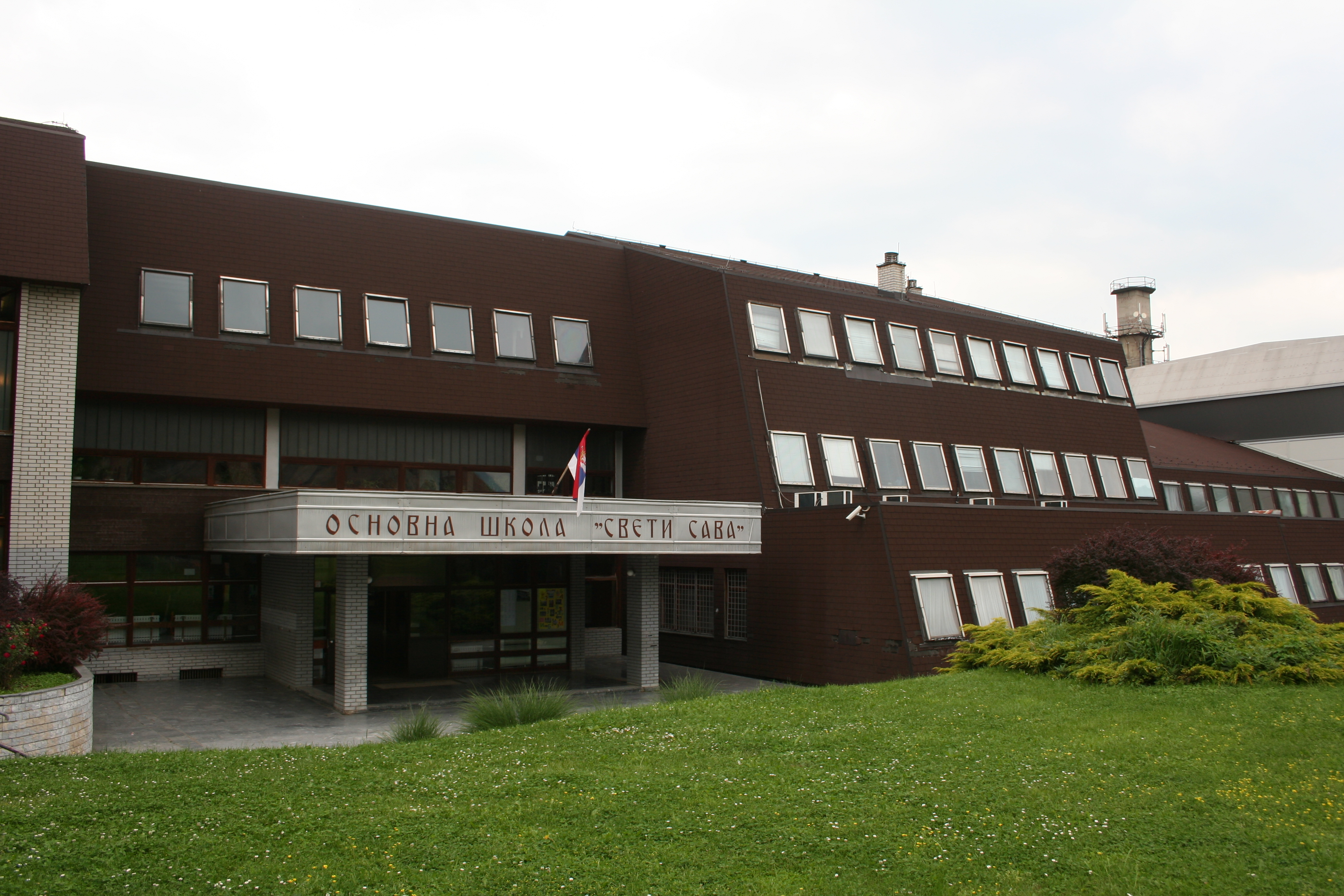
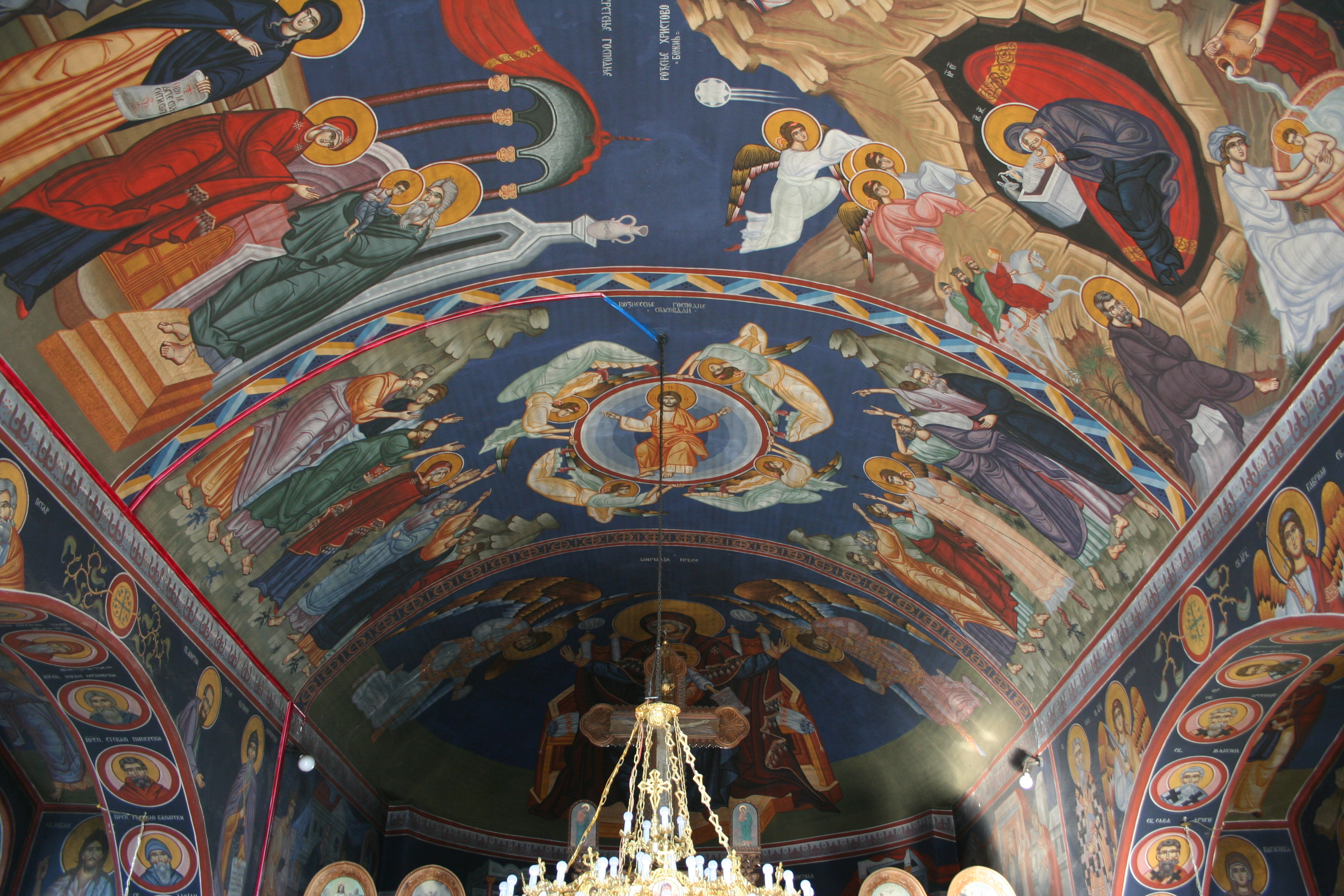
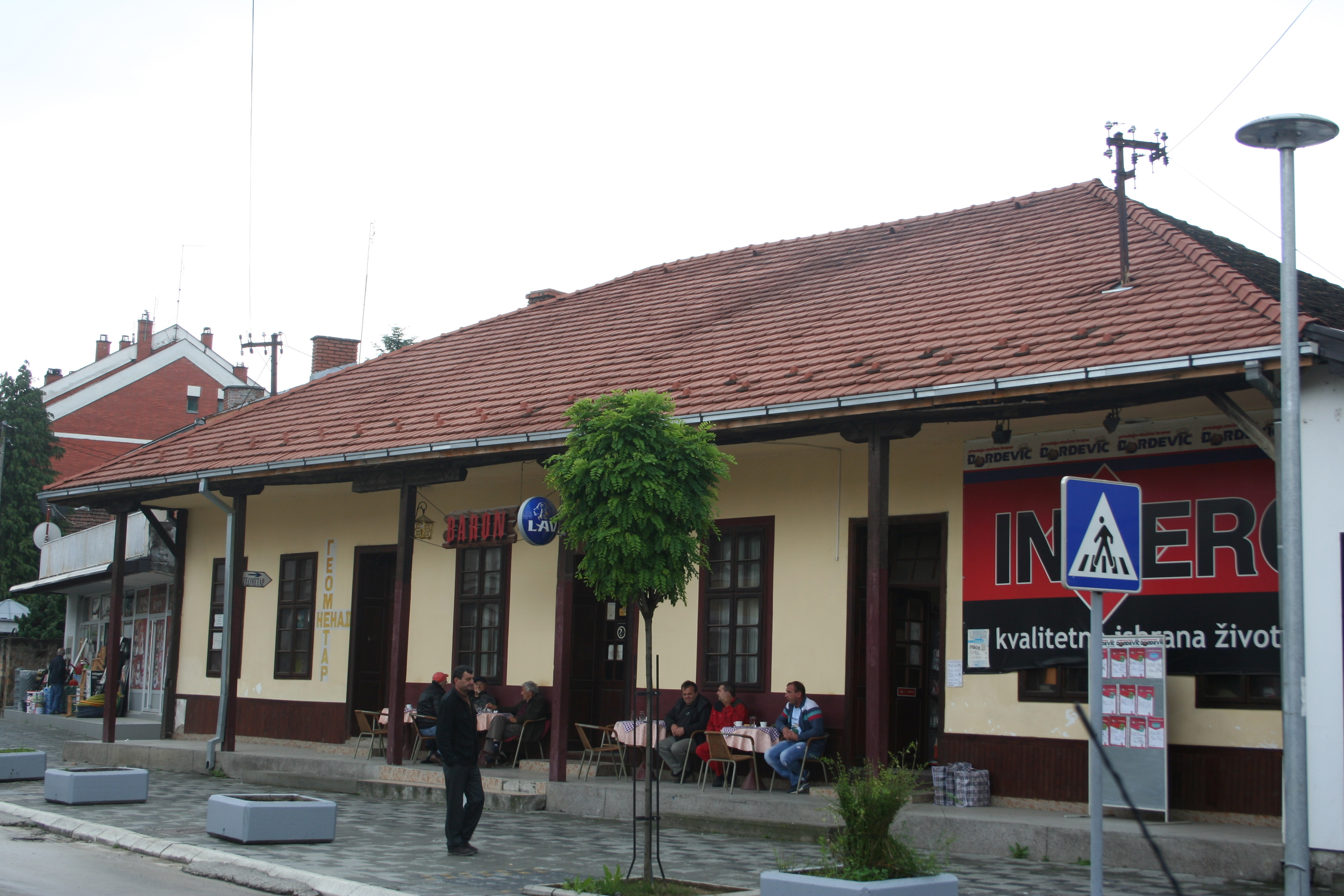
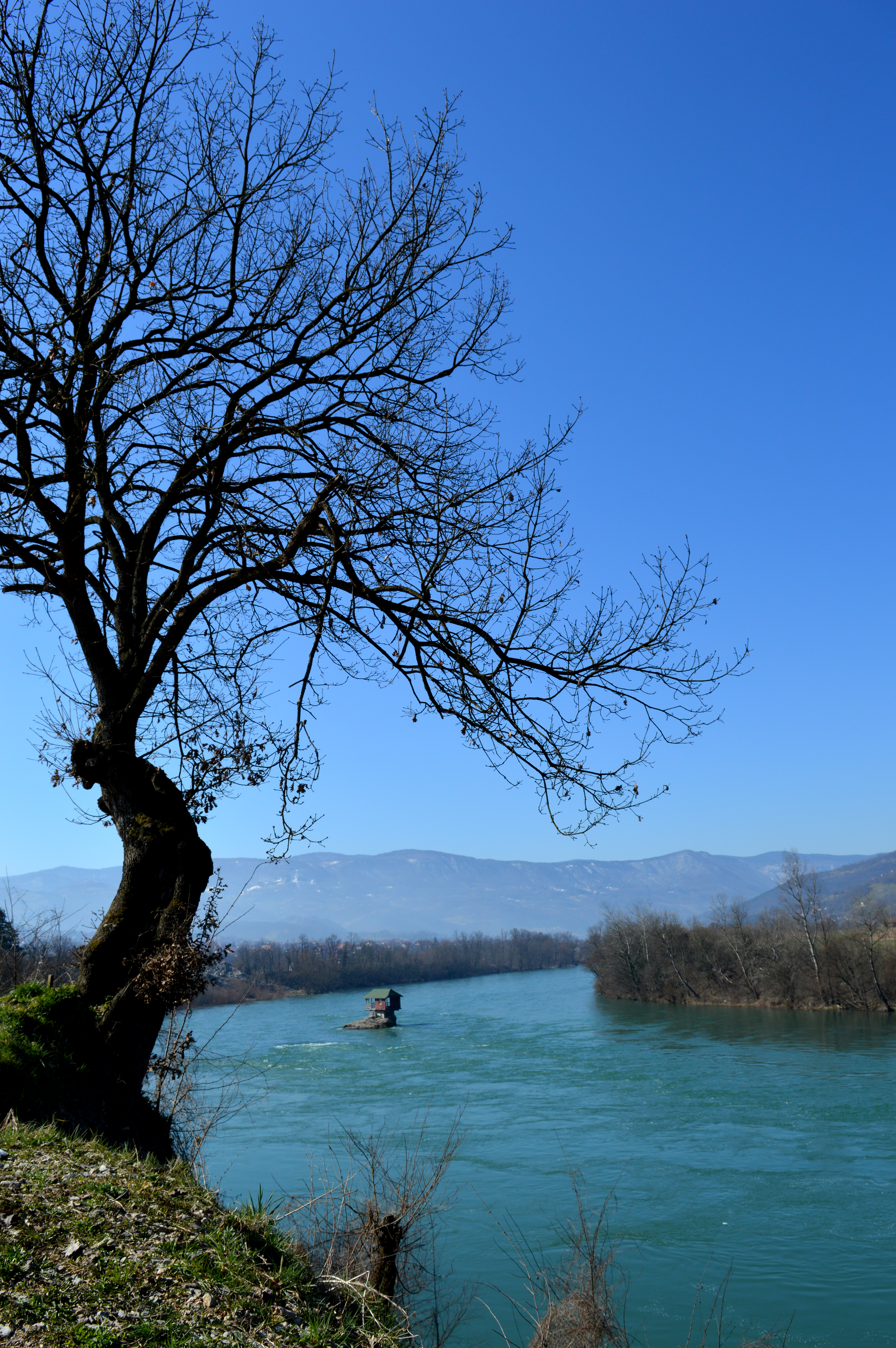
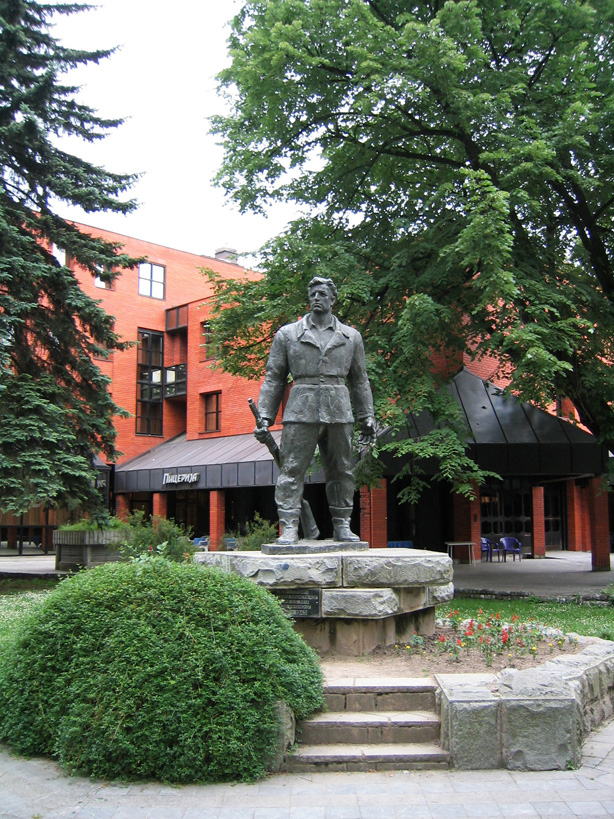
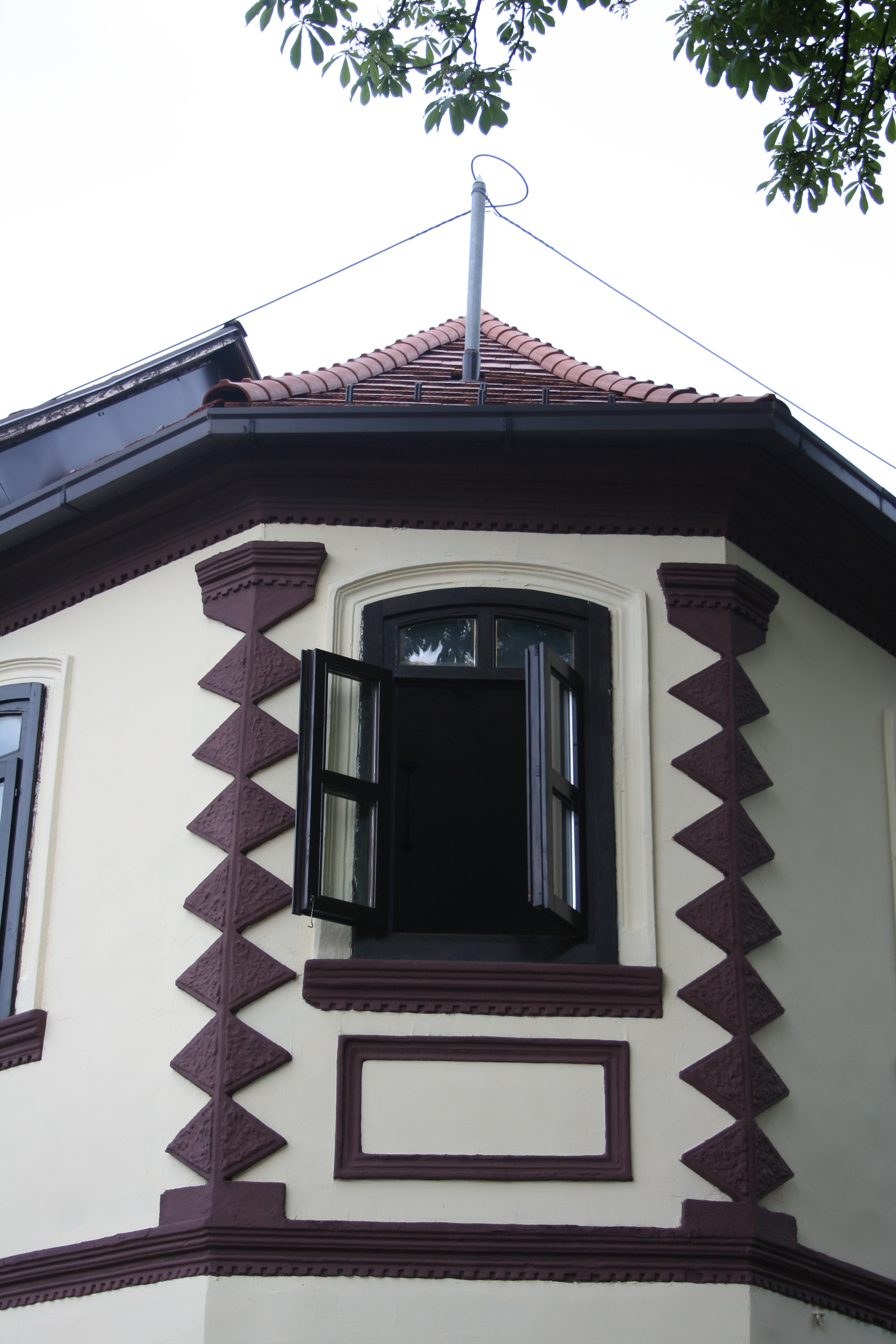
- Bajina Bašta

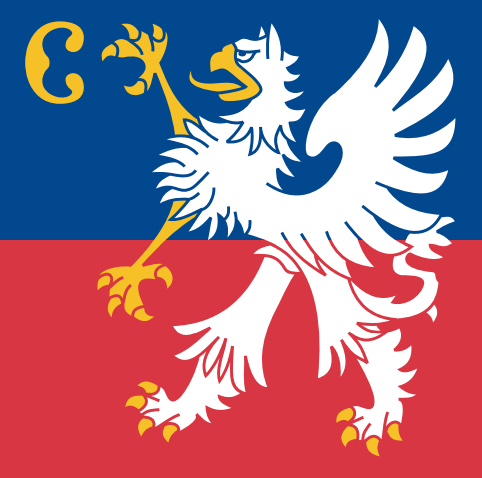
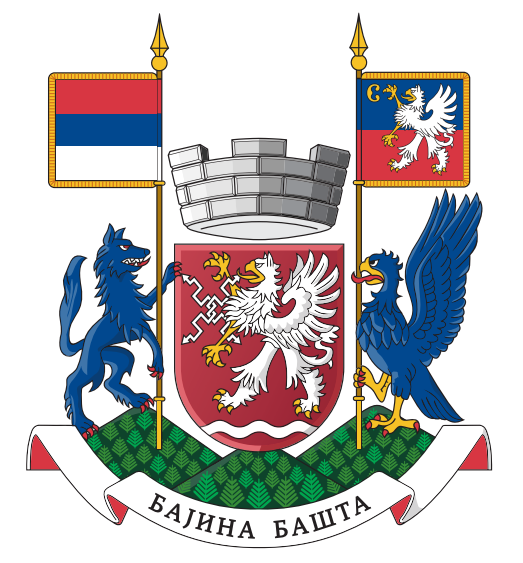
- Flag Coat of arms

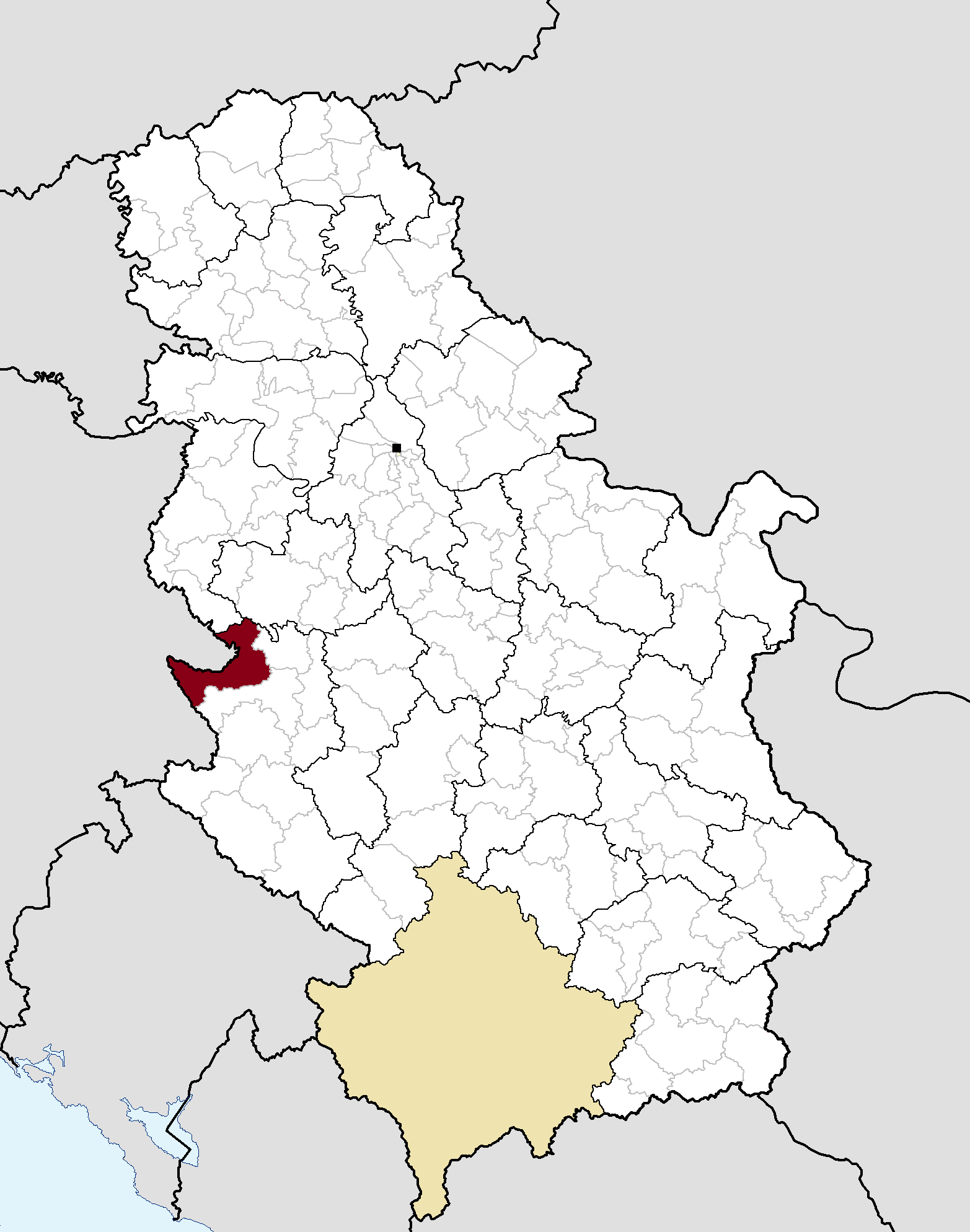
- Location of the municipality of Bajina Bašta within Serbia
- Coordinates: 43°57′N 19°33′E
- Country: Serbia
- Region: Šumadija and Western Serbia
- District: Zlatibor
- Settlements: 36

Government
  - Mayor: Milenko Ordagić (SNS)

Area
  - Town: 3.13 km^{2} (1.21 sq mi)
  - Municipality: 673 km^{2} (260 sq mi)
- Elevation: 257 m (843 ft)

Population (2022 census)
  - Town: 8,971
  - Town density: 2,870/km^{2} (7,420/sq mi)
  - Municipality: 23,533
  - Municipality density: 35.0/km^{2} (90.6/sq mi)
- Time zone: UTC+1 (CET)
  - Summer (DST): UTC+2 (CEST)
- Postal code: 31250
- Area code: +381(0)31
- Car plates: BB
- Website: www.bajinabasta.rs

Bajina Bašta (Serbian Cyrillic: Бајина Башта, pronounced [bâjina bǎːʃta]) is a town and municipality located in the Zlatibor District of western Serbia. The town lies in the valley of the Drina river at the eastern edge of Tara National Park.

According to the 2022 census, the town's population is 8,971 inhabitants, while the municipality has 23,533 inhabitants.

== Etymology ==
The name Bajina Bašta comes from the vast orchards and vegetable gardens, that used to be located on the left bank of the Pilica River, which belonged to a Turkish feudal owner, Baja Osman, who established the town's modern image in the mid-19th century. In English, the name Bajina Bašta literally means "Baja’s Garden".

== History ==
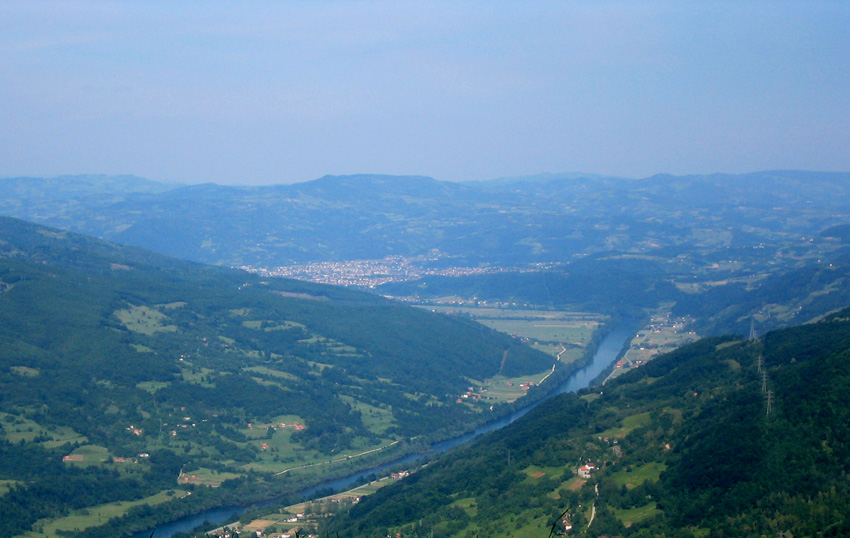
The Drina valley looking towards Bajina Bašta.

=== Archaeology ===
The areas around Bajina Bašta have significant historical heritage. In the village of Pilica, there are archeological remains of Roman architecture dating from the 2nd and 3rd century and ornamented tombstones. Other archeological sites lie in the Kremna valley (43 tombstones), Mokra Gora (38), Perućac, Rastište and Dub. The oldest historical findings in this area date from the Neolithic period (5,000 year B.C.) – remains of these communities, Kremenilo and Jokin Breg, are found near Višesava. The remnants of these settlements show that people lived in about 2.5 m deep dugouts, on three underground levels. Judging by their characteristics, these remains are considered to have belonged to the Starčevo culture. Additionally, there is much evidence of the Iron Age material culture of the Autariatae. During Roman, Byzantine and Medieval period, Bajina Bašta was an important trade center and the cross-border with Bosnia.

=== History ===
In 1834 Bajina Bašta was established on the site of the village of Pljeskovo which was situated on the right bank of the Drina river, between the Rača and Pilica rivers, under the eastern foothills of the Tara mountain. In accordance with the Serbian-Ottoman agreement, the local Muslims in the area moved to the other side of the Drina (in Bosnia and Herzegovina), where they established the villages of Skelani and Dobrak. In 1858 the town became the administrative center of the Rača District. On September 15, 1872, Milan Obrenović IV issued a decree that recognized Bajina Bašta its status as a town. A decade later, Bajina Bašta received its urban plan, long before many places in Serbia.

During the Ottoman Empire, the Rača region was part of the Soko nahiya of the Sanjak of Zvornik, and later on part of the Užice nahija. In the following tumultuous decades, Bajina Bašta belonged to the Užice District, Užice canton, and region. Today, the town lies in the Zlatibor District. In 1875 a mixed craftsmen guild was founded with 88 different occupations, based on forestry and stock farming. In attempts to improve trade links between Serbia and Bosnia, the first customs station was opened in Skelani in 1880. The following year, the first post office with a telegraph was opened. The number of inhabitants increased from 374 in 1864 to 1,306 by 1910. Residents in the nearby village of Rača made a major contribution in the Serbian-Turkish War (1876–1878). In the following Balkan Wars and World War I (1912–1918), over 300 people from the small village died.

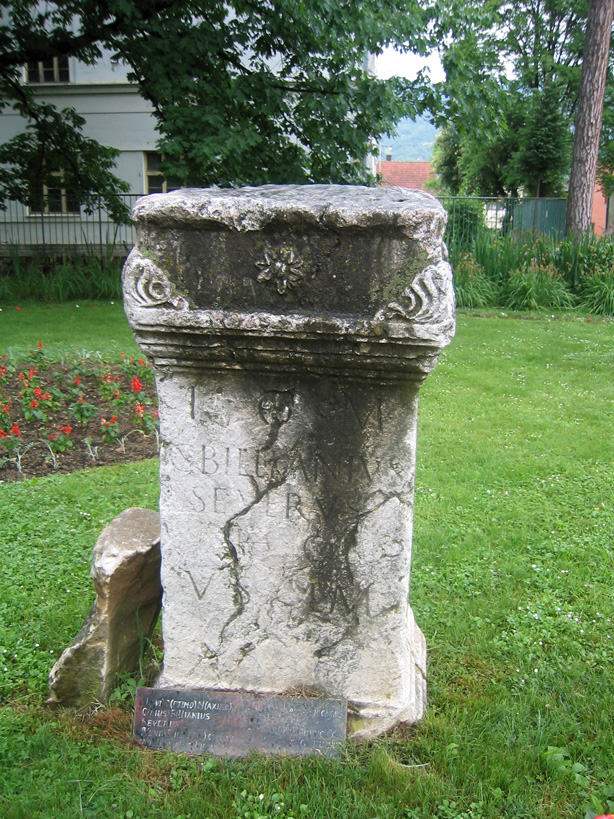
Roman ruins in downtown Bajina Bašta.

The Rača monastery (7 km southwest) is considered the most significant historical treasure of the area. Built by King Stefan Dragutin (1276–1282), the monastery was the center of transcription and illumination of medieval religious manuscripts of Serbia. These monks became known as the Račani. Abundant wall paintings and iconostasis cover the walls, dating after the church's reconstruction in 1835. The monastery houses a treasury and a library containing over 1,200 books and manuscripts. In the village of Dub (10 km from Bajina Bašta) there is a wooden church from 1792, of a specific architecture, covered with shingle roof. A variety of ornaments and icons, a gate from the 17th century, make this church one of the more memorable churches in Serbia.

1918–1945

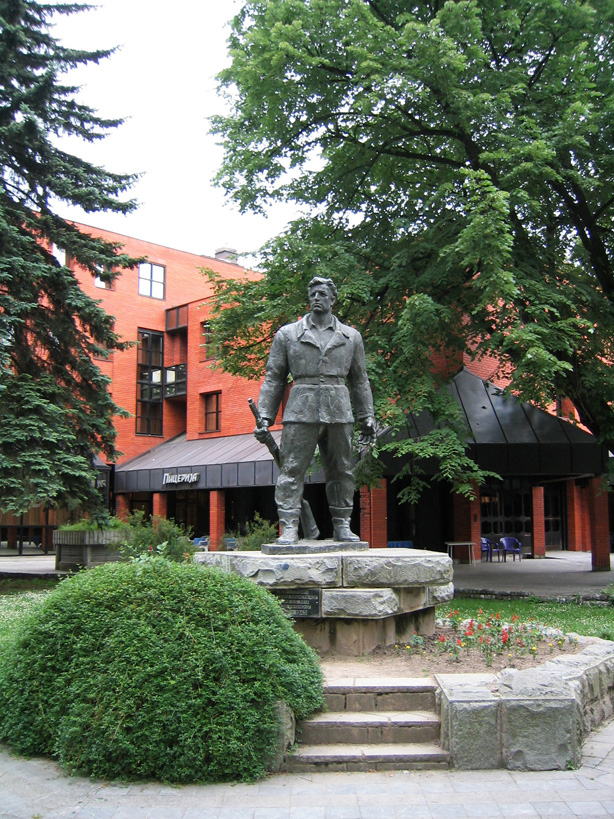
The Monument to the Unknown Soldier from World War II.

During the unification of the Southern Slavs of Europe and creation of the Kingdom of Serbs, Croats and Slovenes, Bajina Bašta continued its urban expansion. In 1926, a metal bridge that linked to Skelani was built, replacing the ferry that crossed the Drina River. The electrification of the town started in 1928 and two years later the first town's hospital was built. The utilization of forests, the famed bajinac tobacco and the construction of elementary schools in the region greatly helped improve the standard of living and educational level of the inhabitants. In 1940, the downtown area built its first water piping and sewage system and cobblestone streets.

During World War II, Bajina Bašta was severely damaged. Events that marked human history in the period between 1939–1945, were reflected in this region as well in a form of civil war and liberation fights against the occupying Axis army. A Račan militia was formed in the first stages of the armed resistance against the occupants. From August 3–23, 1941, the militia solidified into a military formation consisting of 62 soldiers. The first free territory in the occupied Europe – "Republic of Užice", brought only temporary liberation to Bajina Bašta. In this region, the first People's Liberation Committee NOO was formed. During the war, especially in 1943, Bulgarian forces caused many civilian casualties. Bajina Bašta was liberated from Nazi forces on September 12, 1944.

1945–1999

After the World War II ended, Bajina Bašta continued to develop into an economical, cultural and administrative center of the municipality which extended 672 km^{2} (418 miles²) around the town. The second half of the 20th century is marked by the expansion of trade, banking, agricultural cooperatives, sawmills and craftsmen guilds. Intensive economic growth began in 1966 when the Bajina Bašta Hydroelectric Power Plant in Perućac was put in operation. This is the second largest hydroelectric power plant in Serbia today, after Đerdap on the Danube River.

During the turmoil in Bosnia-Hercegovina 1992–1995 (Bosnian War) Bajina Bašta came under occasionally shelling from Bosnian Muslims (Bosniaks) offensive operations in early 1993. Several villages north of Bajina Bašta along the Drina river on the Serbian side came under fire in this period. First when the VRS (Bosnian Serb army) later during 1993 launched counter offensive operations the sporadic attacks stopped.

1999–present

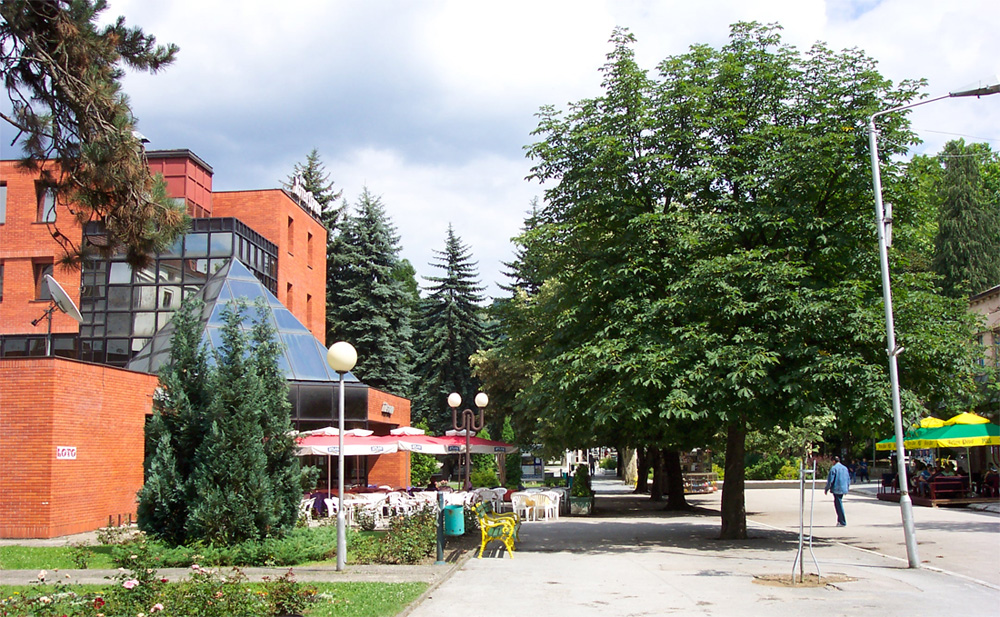
Bajina Bašta's main street.

The town has preserved architecture from the end of the 19th and the first half of the 20th century, which goes along well with the more recent urban structures. Rural settlements are more archaic in layout and building structure, the most attractive and significant ones are Rogačica, the former center of the Rača district, as well as Kostojevići, Pilica, and other localities.

The expansion and development of Bajina Bašta by the modern urbanization plan was directed along the main streets which are part of the main routes from Užice to Perućac (Kneza Milana Obrenovića Street) and Rogačica to Tara (Svetosavska Street). These routes intersect in the town's center. Bajina Bašta is considered a modern urban settlement with potential for horizontal expansion. Downtown Bajina Bašta is a mixture of commercial, residential, and administrative buildings of different facades and height. The heart of the town is Dušana Jerkovića Square, which is surrounded by the old-style architecture found in Serbia during the mid to late 19th century.

== Climate ==
Bajina Bašta's climate is moderate continental with four distinct seasons. Summers are warm and pleasant with cool nights, and winters are sunny, with snow levels high enough for widespread winter sports. However, the humidity of the air increased greatly after the construction of the power plant in Perućac and the formation of the artificial Perućac Lake and Zaovine Lake, in the mountains. The average annual rainfall is 700–800 mm locally, contributing to a marked agricultural environment.

Bajina Bašta has an oceanic climate (Köppen climate classification: Cfb) that's very close to a humid continental climate (Köppen climate classification: Dfb).

Climate data for Bajina Bašta
Month	Jan	Feb	Mar	Apr	May	Jun	Jul	Aug	Sep	Oct	Nov	Dec	Year
Mean daily maximum °C (°F)	4.5 (40.1)	7.3 (45.1)	12.7 (54.9)	16.5 (61.7)	21.2 (70.2)	24.7 (76.5)	27.1 (80.8)	27.4 (81.3)	23.9 (75.0)	18.3 (64.9)	10.5 (50.9)	6.1 (43.0)	16.7 (62.0)
Daily mean °C (°F)	0.7 (33.3)	3.1 (37.6)	7.4 (45.3)	11.0 (51.8)	15.5 (59.9)	18.9 (66.0)	20.9 (69.6)	20.9 (69.6)	17.5 (63.5)	12.7 (54.9)	6.4 (43.5)	2.6 (36.7)	11.5 (52.6)
Mean daily minimum °C (°F)	−3.0 (26.6)	−1.0 (30.2)	2.1 (35.8)	5.5 (41.9)	9.9 (49.8)	13.2 (55.8)	14.8 (58.6)	14.5 (58.1)	11.2 (52.2)	7.1 (44.8)	2.4 (36.3)	−0.8 (30.6)	6.3 (43.4)
Average precipitation mm (inches)	68 (2.7)	64 (2.5)	61 (2.4)	73 (2.9)	87 (3.4)	89 (3.5)	76 (3.0)	64 (2.5)	70 (2.8)	72 (2.8)	87 (3.4)	85 (3.3)	896 (35.2)
Source: Climate-Data.org

== Demographics ==
Historical population
Year	Pop.	±% p.a.
1948	34,183	—
1953	35,283	+0.64%
1961	34,067	−0.44%
1971	31,387	−0.82%
1981	30,860	−0.17%
1991	29,747	−0.37%
2002	29,151	−0.18%
2011	26,022	−1.25%
2022	23,533	−0.91%

According to the 2011 census results, the municipality of Bajina Bašta has 26,022 people. The town itself hosts 9,148 people while the other 16,874 live in thirty-five outlying villages and non-urban areas surrounding the town.

Most of the residing population are immigrants, who after the liberation of the area from the Turks in the 19th century, settled these areas, originally coming from Herzegovina, the northwestern parts of Montenegro, Sandžak, Osat (Bosnia), Dalmatia (Pepelj) and Kremna. At present, a considerable decrease in population is recorded due to economic migrations towards the regional centers of Serbia, such as Užice, Valjevo, Čačak, and Belgrade.

=== Ethnic groups ===
Ethnic composition of the municipality:

Ethnic group	Population	%
Serbs	25,638	98.52%
Roma	120	0.46%
Montenegrins	43	0.17%
Yugoslavs	17	0.07%
Croats	13	0.05%
Macedonians	13	0.05%
Russians	10	0.04%
Muslims	9	0.03%
Albanians	8	0.03%
Others	151	0.58%
Total	26,022	

== Economy ==
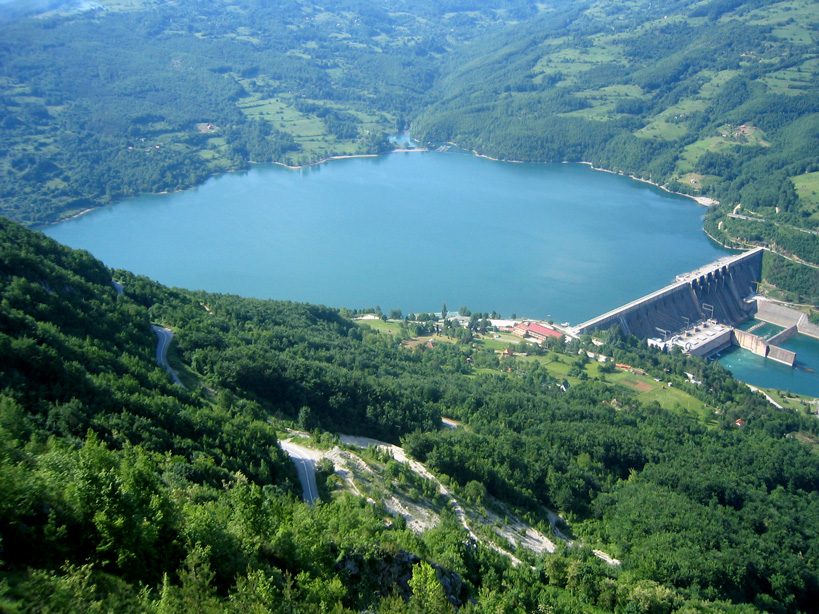
Bajina Bašta Hydroelectric Power Plant in Perućac.

The greatest natural resources of the municipality are the Drina River and Tara Mountain. The Drina is especially significant for its water power potentials. Specialists have estimated that it is possible to erect several hydroelectric power plants on this river. The annual flow of the Drina River is about 12.5 cubic kilometers of water. The Bajina Bašta Hydroelectric power plant was built on the Drina to harness that energy. The dam is located 12 km west of Bajina Bašta, near Perućac. Its average annual production amounts to 1,625 GWh of electric power. For the sake of better utilization of water power potential, the first reversible hydro-electric power plant in Europe was built in Zaovine, near the top of Tara Mountain.

Tara Mountain has long been a well-known tourist resort owing to its pleasant moderately continental and sub-continental climate. In 1981, Tara became a national park. It covers an area of 300 square kilometers and is the largest natural park in Serbia. The mountain has an abundance of flora and fauna. Apart from white pine tree, maple-trees and famous Serbian Spruce (Picea omorika), here you can find rare game including bear, roe deer, and chamois. The Drina River is a part of the local cultural identity and has great potential in rafting sports and fishing.

Moderate continental and mountainous climatic conditions are especially suitable for recovery and medical treatment of patients with bronchial asthma, chronic bronchitis, anemia and other diseases. Special attention is paid to tourism development and different tourist manifestations utilizing the clean and clear air of Tara Mountain.

Industry had developed fairly well in Bajina Bašta, but recently saw a major downturn due to economic hardships and the civil wars that raged across the region in the 1990s. The major employers before the outbreak of the Yugoslav Wars were:

- Crni Vrh, a wood-processing and furniture factory (Active)
- Elektroizgradnja Bajina Bašta, makers of power line towers and industrial electronic equipment (Active)
- Razvoj, a construction corporation (Active)
- Zemljoradnička zadruga Bajina Bašta, a farmers' co-operative – production of highest grade raspberry, as well as different kinds of fruits (plums, pears, apples), vegetables (potatoes, beans, cabbage, corn) (Active)
- Kadinjača, a textiles corporation (Active, but with limited capacity)
- IKL, a manufacturer of metal parts and ball bearings (Closed)
- Tarateks, a ready-wear manufacturer (Closed)
- Sloboda a manufacturer of electronics and household appliances (Closed)
- Laminat, a manufacturer of cardboard and cardboard containers (Closed)

The closing of some of these companies threw a majority of Bajina Bašta's and surrounding region's population into unemployment which lasted from 1990 until 2015. The only company from old days still functioning well is Drinske Hidroelektrane (Drina Hydroelectrics), headquartered in downtown Bajina Bašta. Drina Hydroelectrics are the owners of the Perućac and Višegrad hydroelectric power plants. Since 2015 economy is in full swing and unemployment rate is below average of the republic. Well known employers in real sector are BB Klekovača (brandy producer), Temelj (construction company), Elektroizgradnja (wires and electrical services), Pinus (wooden products) and Rolomatik (aluminum doors and windows, engineering constructions).

Thanks to exceptionally good climatic conditions, Bajina Bašta has exceptional potential for agricultural profit. High-quality types of tobacco and medicinal herbs flourish in the valley of the Drina, grown by Bajinovac, an agriculture company. Plums, used for the making of Bajina Bašta's own regional juniper brandy Klekovača, grow in abundance. Wheat is a mainstay of the valley, growing well during both the summer and winter growing seasons. The Bajina Bašta municipality is famous for its raspberry farms and Bušinsko polje, which is a part of Bajina Bašta, is famous for its organic strawberry farms.

Economic preview

The following table gives a preview of total number of registered people employed in legal entities per their core activity (as of 2018):

Activity	Total
Agriculture, forestry and fishing	105
Mining and quarrying	5
Manufacturing	1,394
Electricity, gas, steam and air conditioning supply	286
Water supply; sewerage, waste management and remediation activities	173
Construction	677
Wholesale and retail trade, repair of motor vehicles and motorcycles	777
Transportation and storage	272
Accommodation and food services	286
Information and communication	33
Financial and insurance activities	73
Real estate activities	10
Professional, scientific and technical activities	158
Administrative and support service activities	58
Public administration and defense; compulsory social security	283
Education	415
Human health and social work activities	287
Arts, entertainment and recreation	236
Other service activities	100
Individual agricultural workers	418
Total	6,044

== Society and culture ==
=== Tourism ===
There are some traces of the Neolithic age, Iron Age Illyria, and Roman settlements for those interested in history. The ruins of the ancient town Solotnik, the log cabin church in the village Dub and Rača Monastery are important parts of Serbia's cultural legacy. In Tara National Park, Kaluđerske bare and the hotels Omorika (spruce), Javor (maple) and Beli bor (white pine), as well as the children's resort of Mitrovac, are the representative tourist destination which offer swimming pools, skiing and sports facilities.

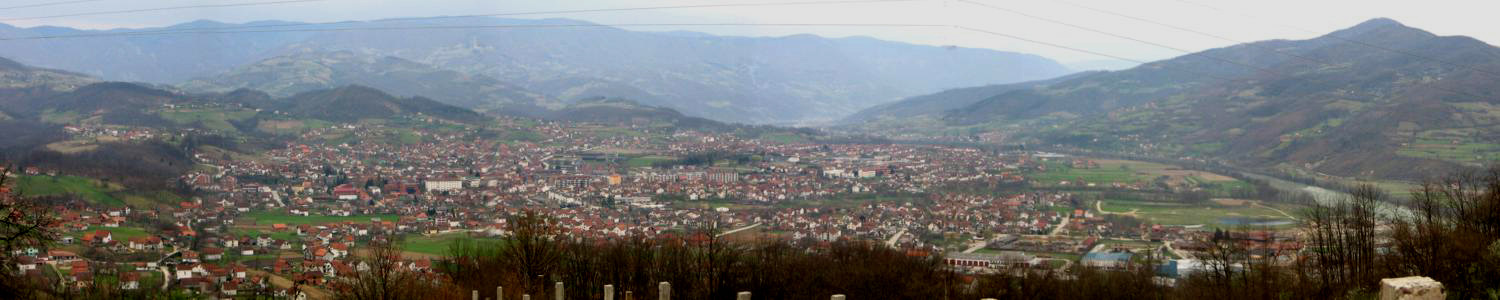
A panoramic view of Bajina Bašta.

- Tara National Park
- Perućac Lake
- Zaovine Lake
- Drina River
- Rača monastery
- Drina Regatta
- Drina river house

=== Education ===
- Elementary School "Rajak Pavićević"
- Elementary School "Sveti Sava"
- High School "Josif Pančić"
- Technical School

=== Communications and media ===
- Radio Bajina Bašta
- TV Bajina Bašta
- Radio Primus
- RTV Prima
- Bajinobaštanska Baština – a quarterly printed publication (In Serbian)
- BBGlas – a monthly printed magazine (In Serbian)

=== Sports organizations ===
- Football (Soccer) Club "Sloga"
- Football (Soccer) Club "Kosmos"
- Football (Soccer) Club "Perucac"
- Indoor Football Club "Bajina Bašta"
- Basketball Club "Bajina Bašta"
- Basketball Club "Bonus"
- Karate Club "Bajina Bašta"
- Karate Club "Omladinac"
- Shooting Club "Radenko Jovanović-Raša"
- Volleyball Club
- Canoe Club "Drina"
- Chess Club
- Handball Club
- Automobile Sports Club "GINA"
- Scout Group "Bajina Bašta"
- Karate club TARA
- Handball club "Hidroelektrana"

=== Annual sports and cultural events ===
- FIA European Rally Championship – YU Rally
- Tara Rally Memorial
- International Fishing Competition "Dani mladice" (Huchen Days)
- The Drina Regatta
- Bajina Bašta track and field meet
- The Days of Rača by the Drina

== See also ==
- List of cities in Serbia
- Drina Regatta
- Church of Saint Elijah, Bajina Bašta
