= Natural area Dobrun-Rzav =

Drina
- IUCN category II (national park)
- Location within Bosnia and Herzegovina
- Coordinates: 43°43′20″N 19°10′10″E
- Area: 63.15 km^{2} (24.38 sq mi)
- Established: 2017

Natural area Dobrun-Rzav is a protected area in Bosnia and Herzegovina. It is located in the canyon of the river Beli Rzav, which flows through Donji Dobrun near Višegrad and merges with the river Drina. The area is planned for protection by the IUCN.

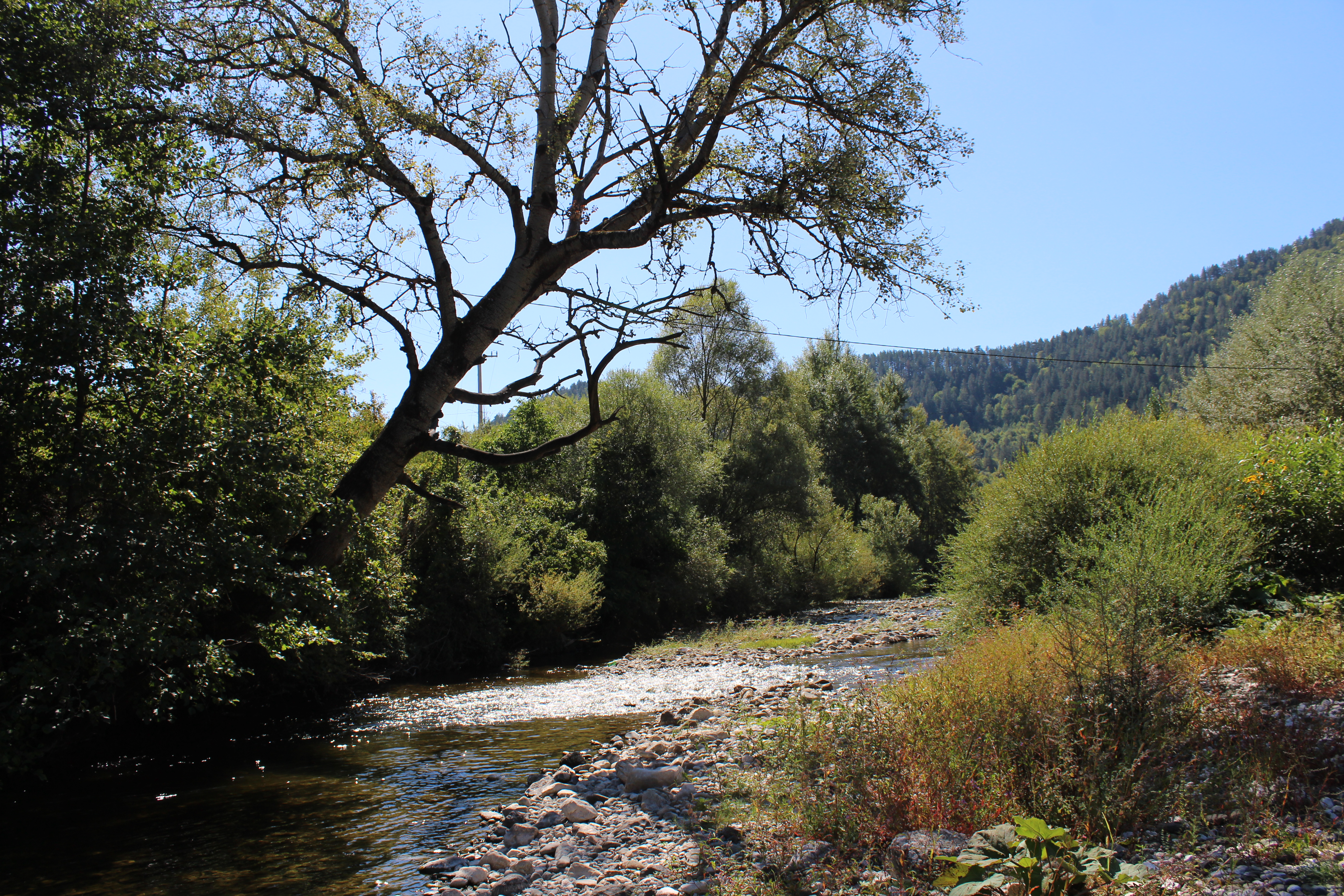

== Gallery ==
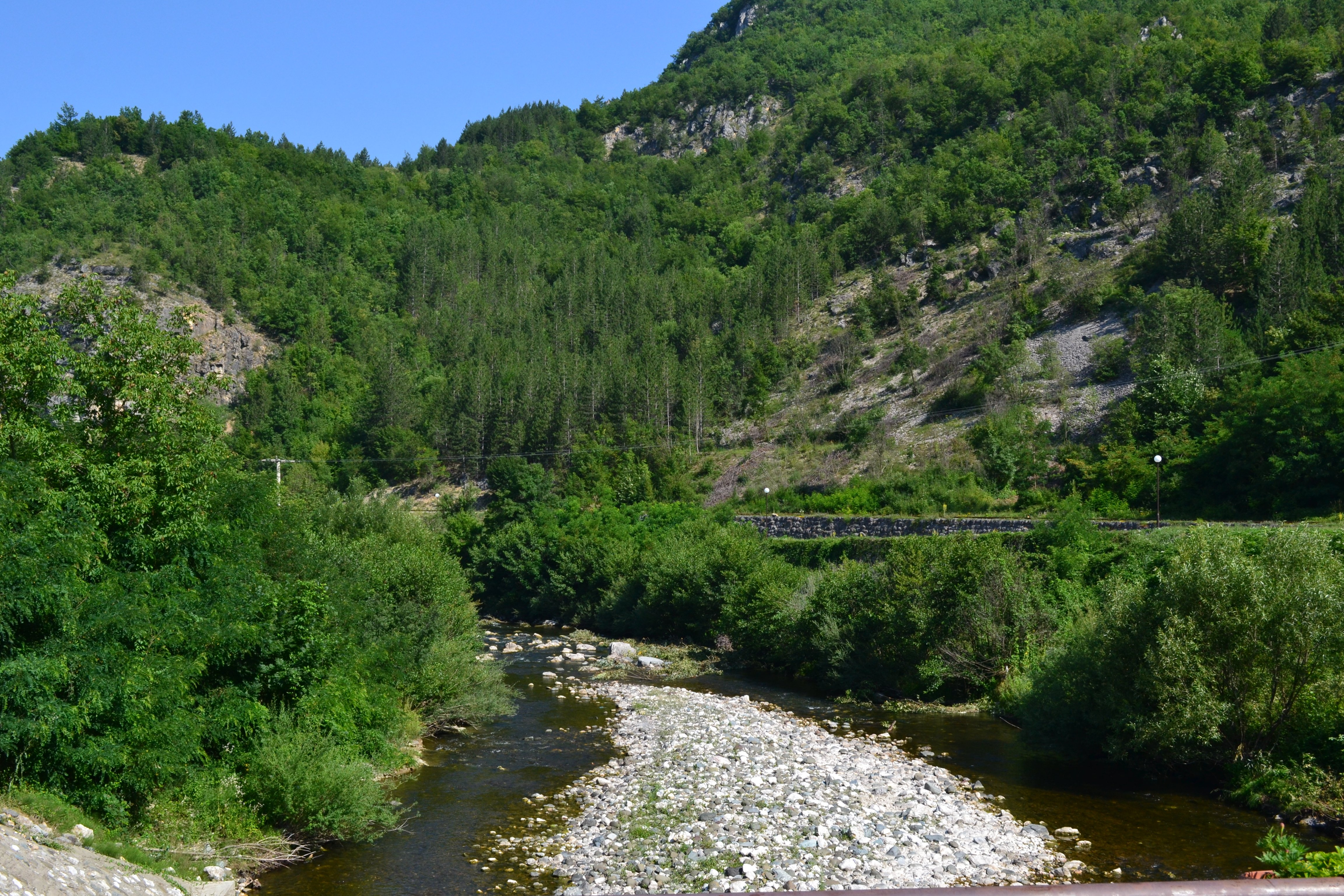

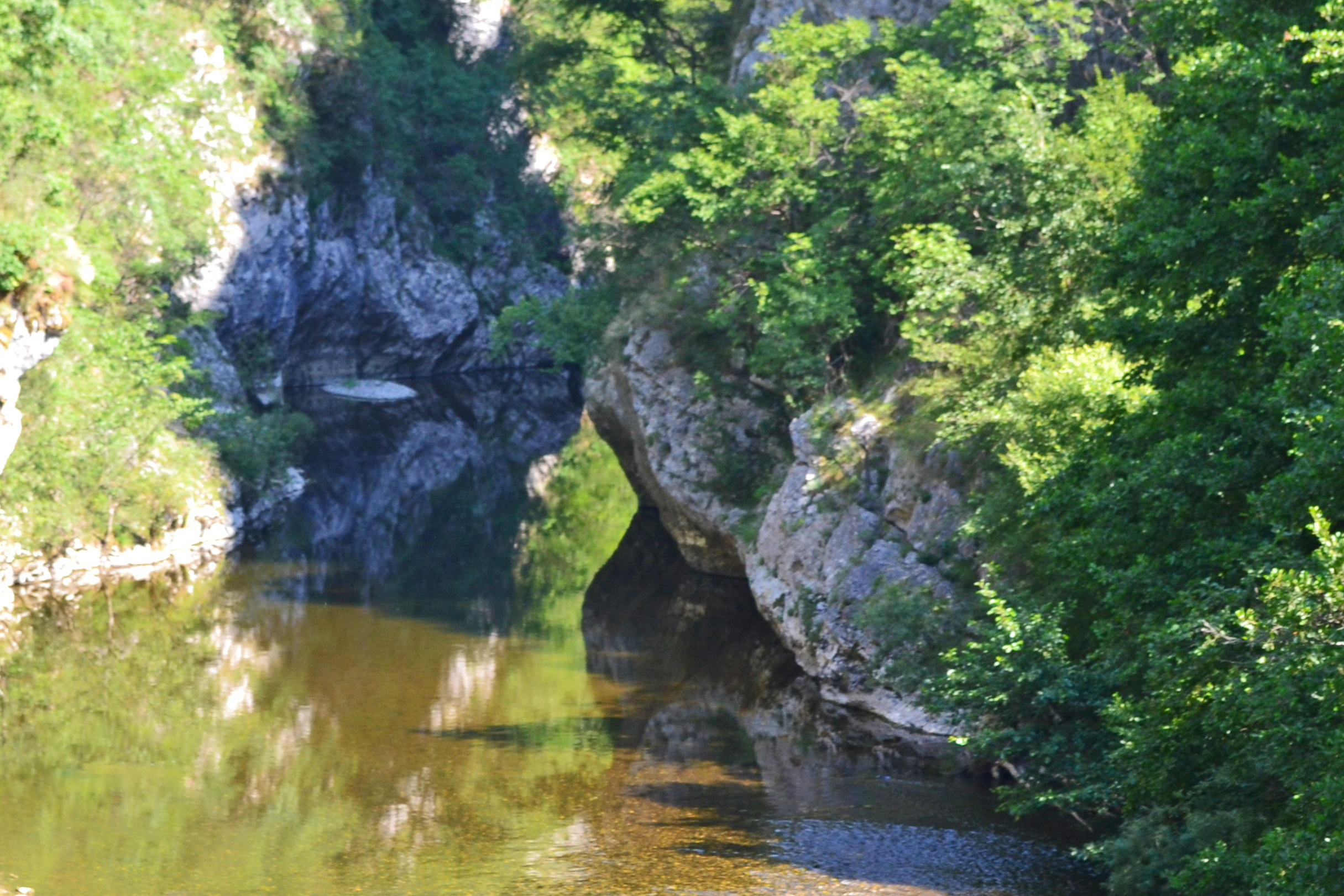

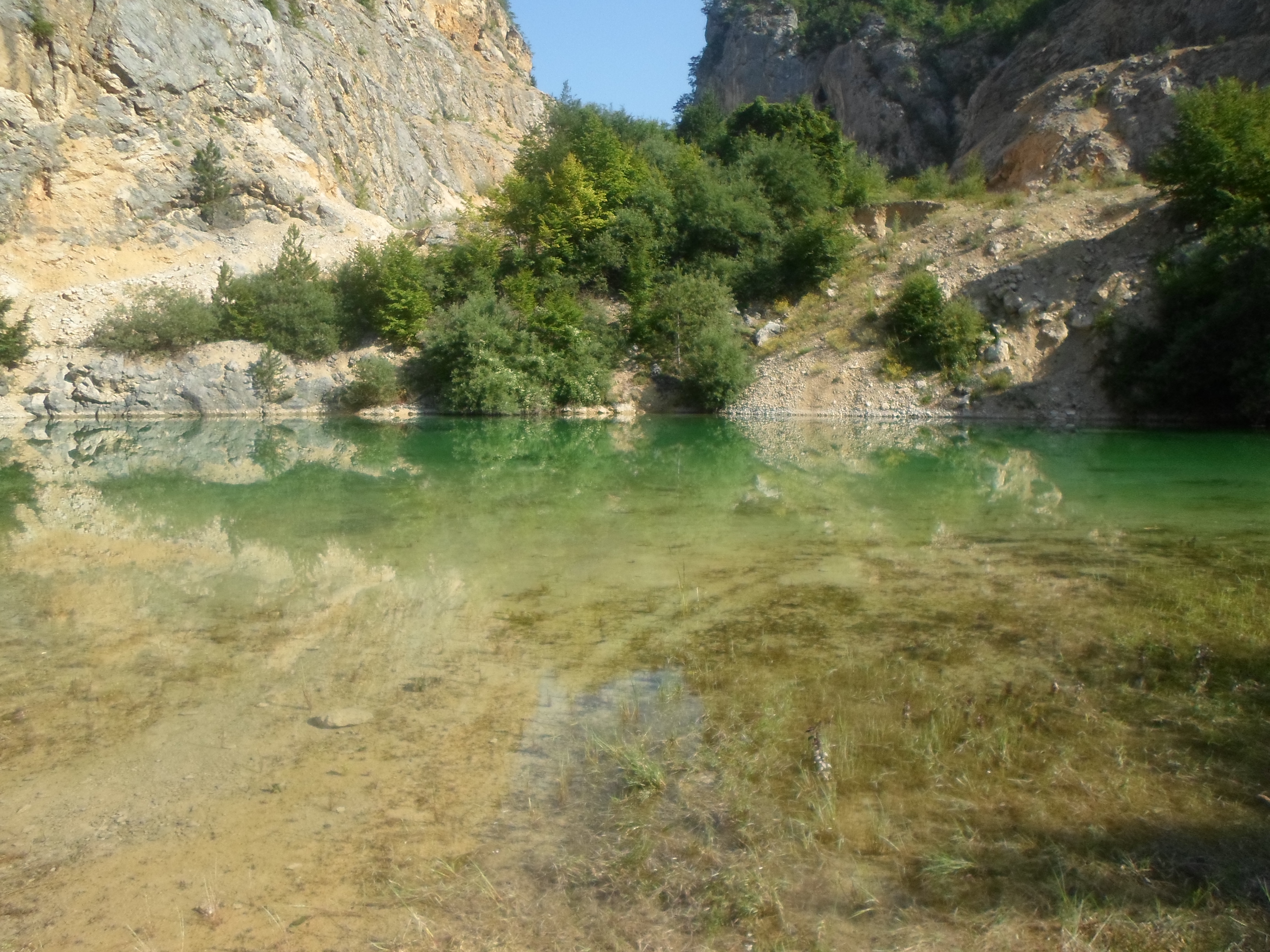

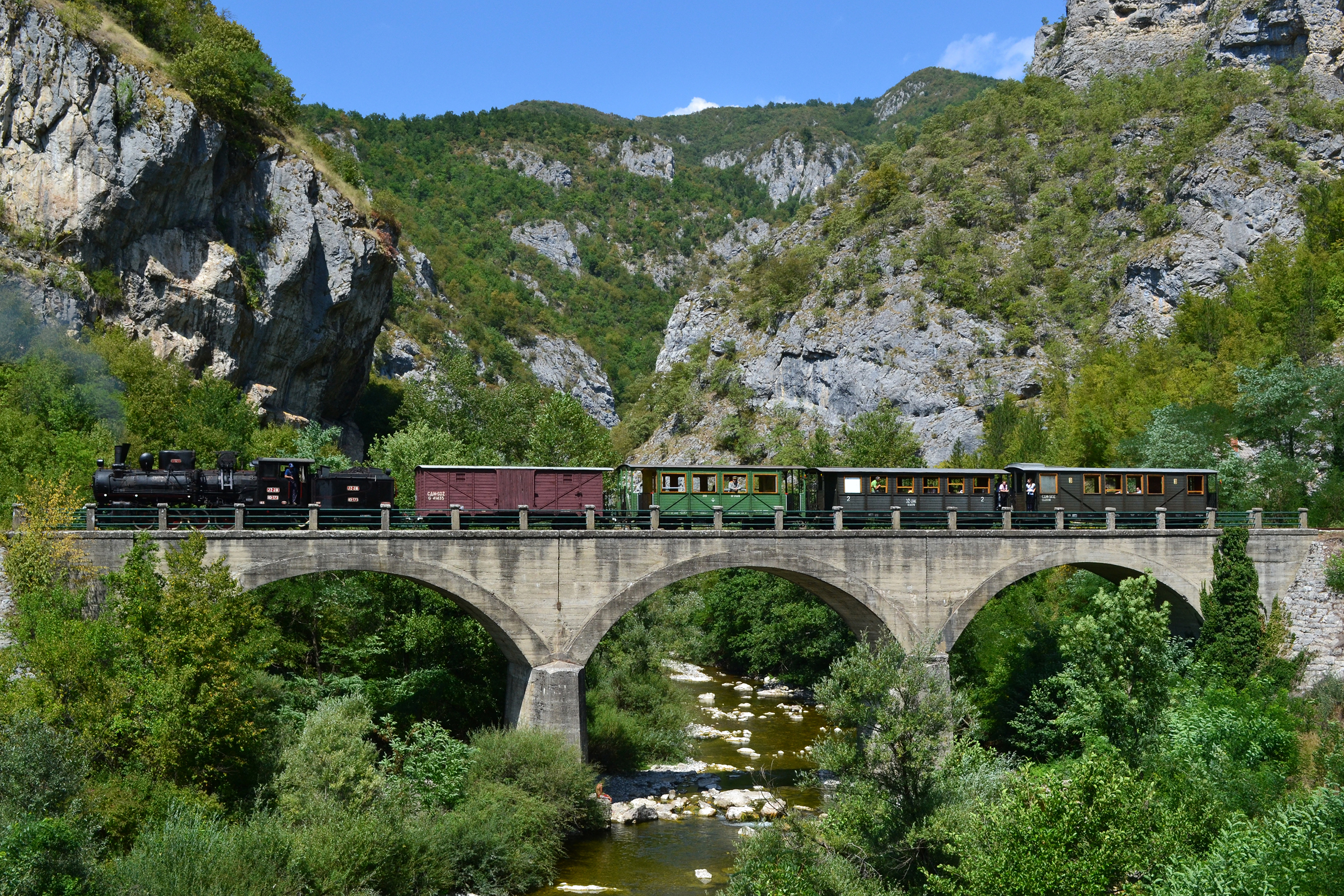

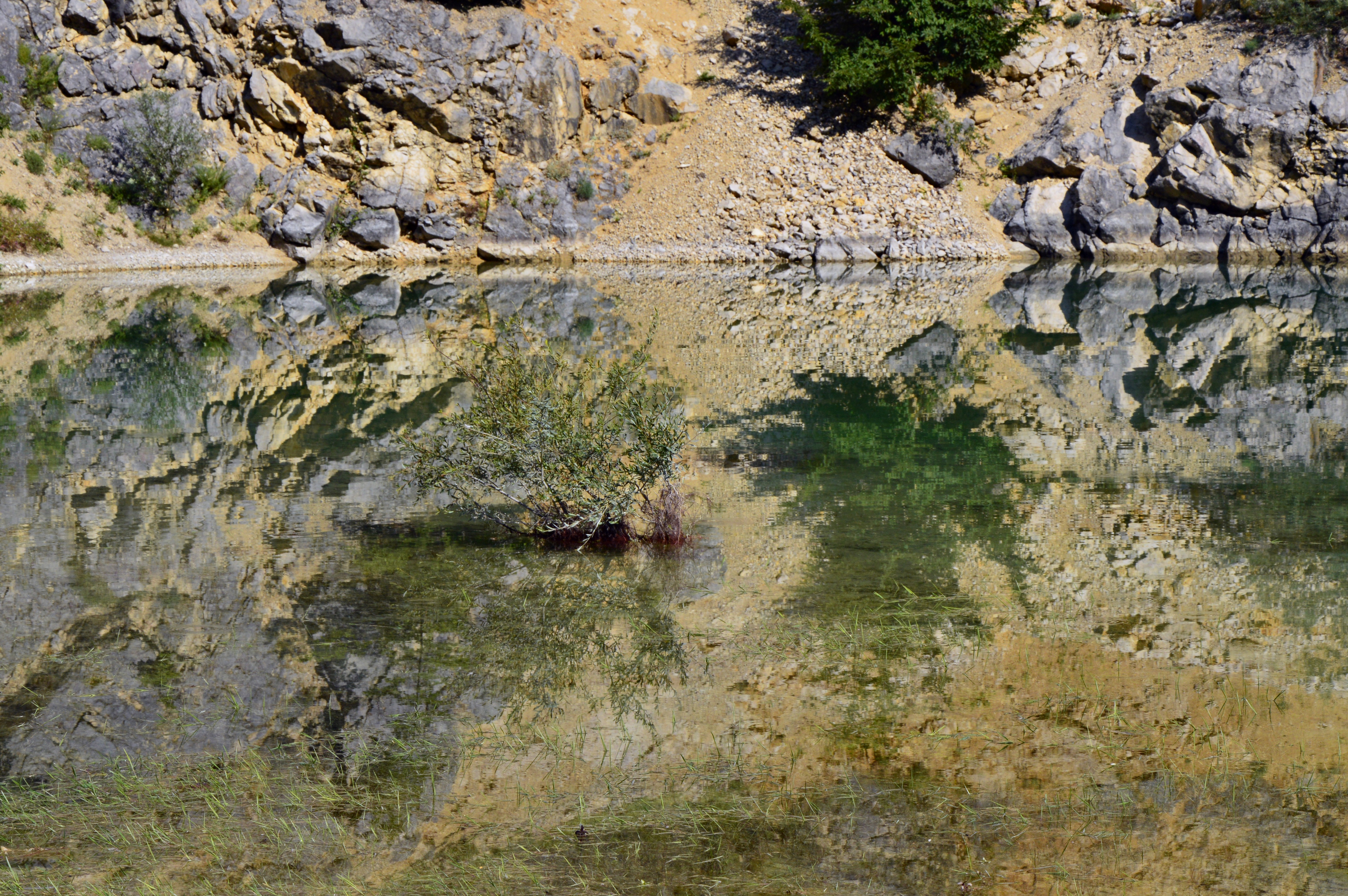

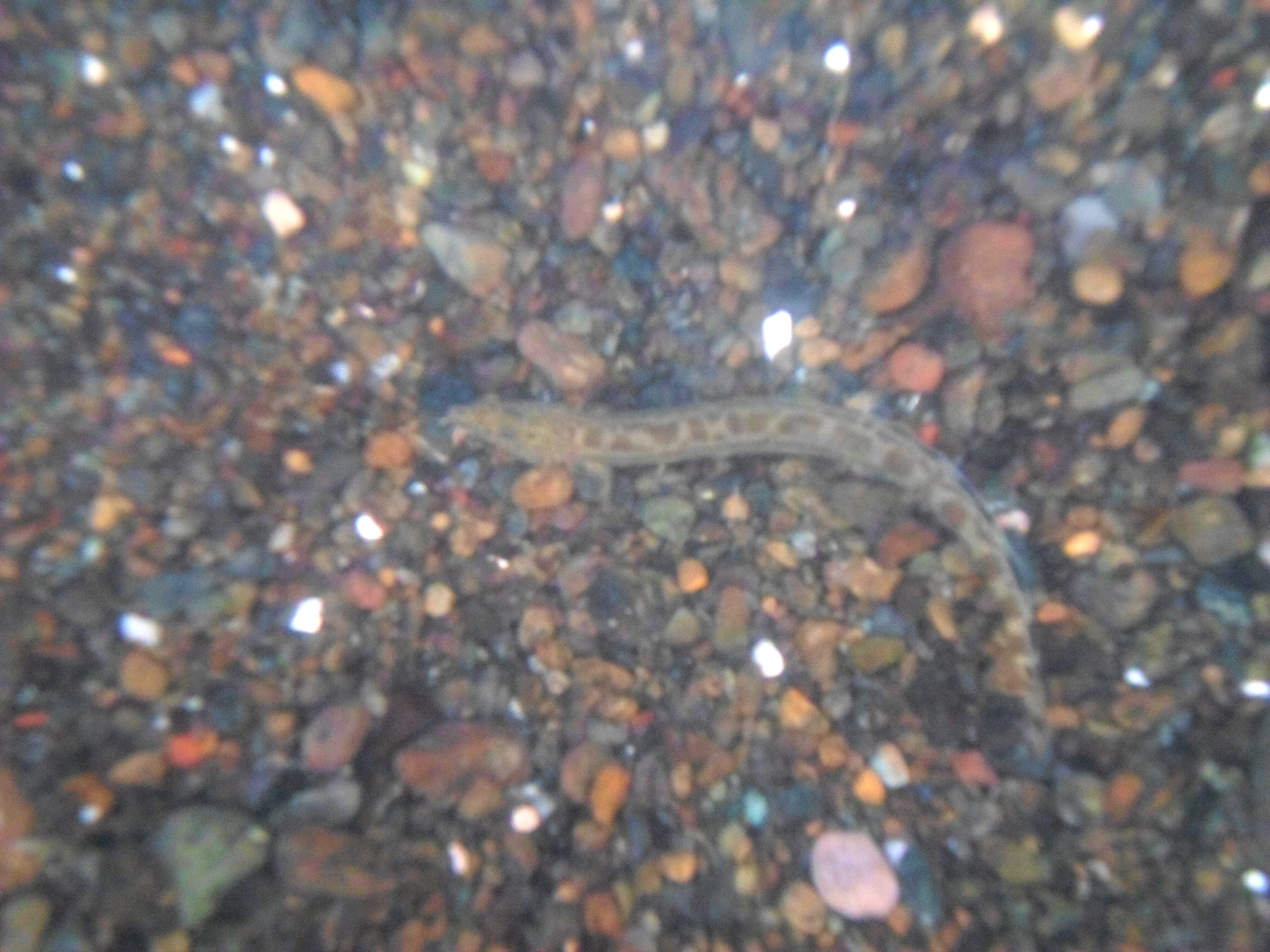

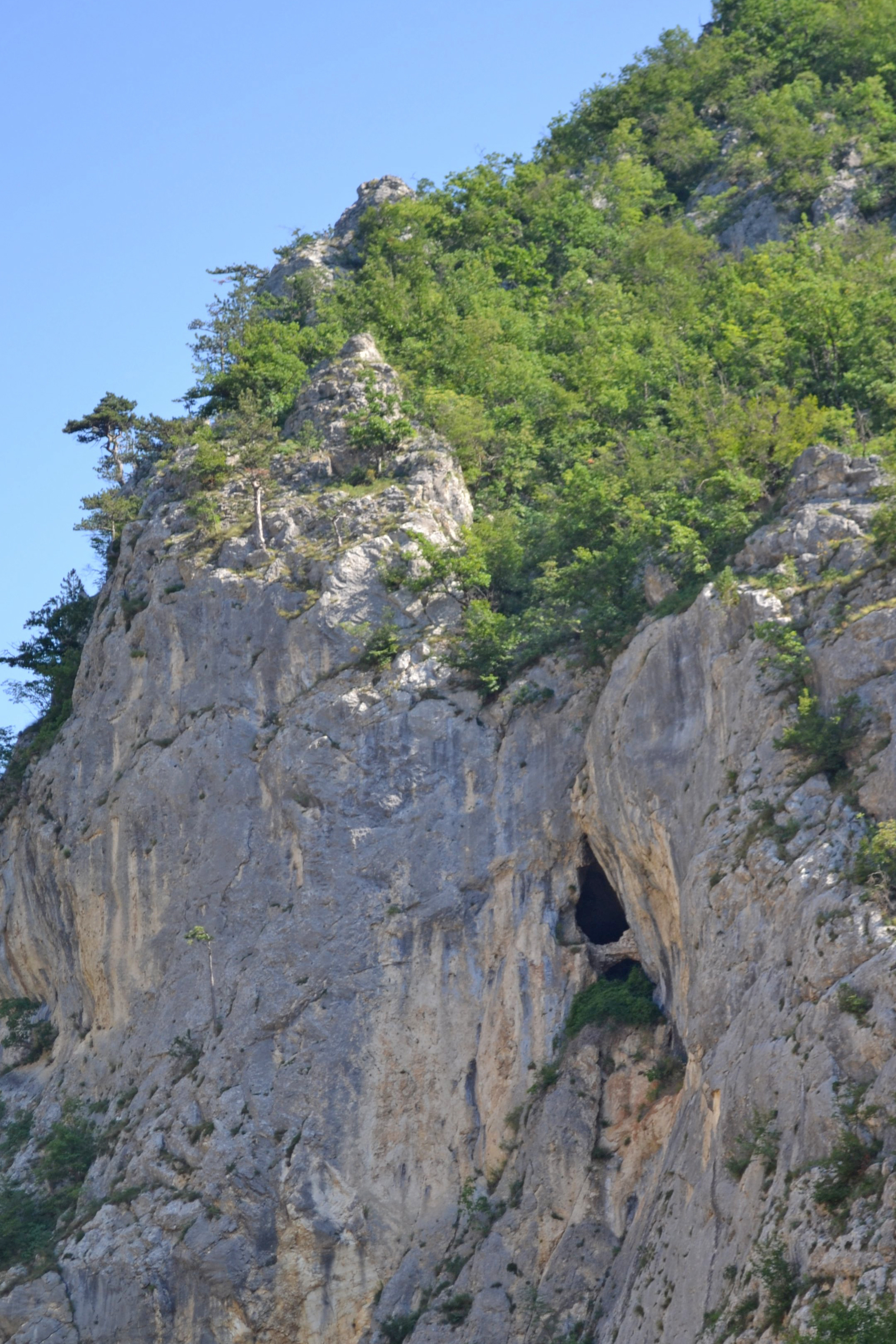

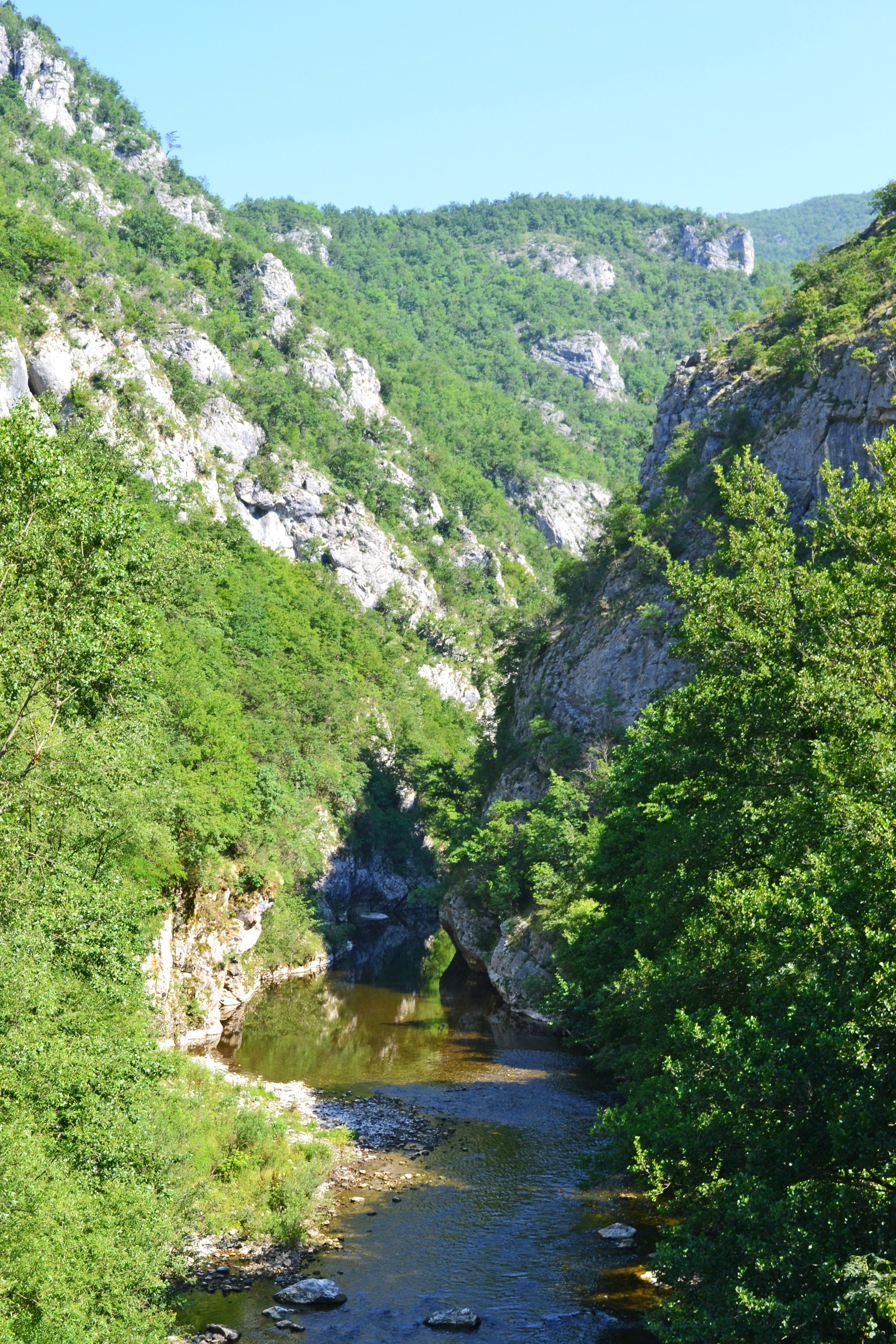

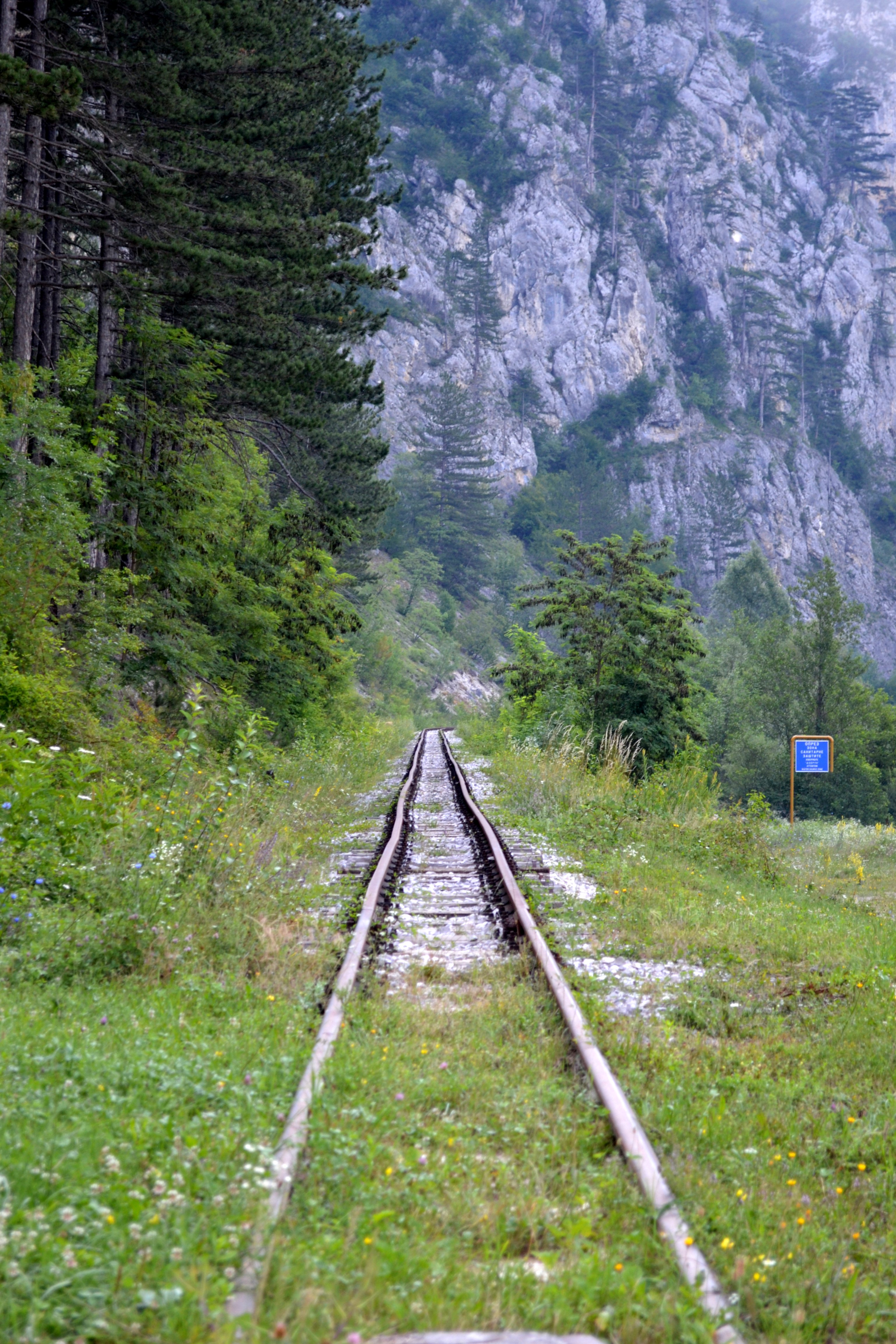

== Source Books ==
- "Mala enciklopedija Prosveta: Opšta enciklopedija". Мала енциклопедија Просвета (3rd ed.). Београд: Просвета. 1985. ISBN 978-86-07-00001-2.
- Марковић, Јован Ђ. (1990). Енциклопедијски географски лексикон Југославије. Сарајево: Свјетлост. ISBN 978-86-01-02651-3.
