= Donji Dobrun =

- Village
- Location within Bosnia and Herzegovina
- Coordinates: 43.7467°N 19.4025°E
- Country: Bosnia and Herzegovina
- Entity: Republika Srpska
- Municipality: Višegrad
- Time zone: UTC+1 (CET)
  - Summer (DST): UTC+2 (CEST)

Donji Dobrun (Serbian: Доњи Добрун) is a village in the municipality of Višegrad, Bosnia and Herzegovina.
